= Geology of Wyoming =

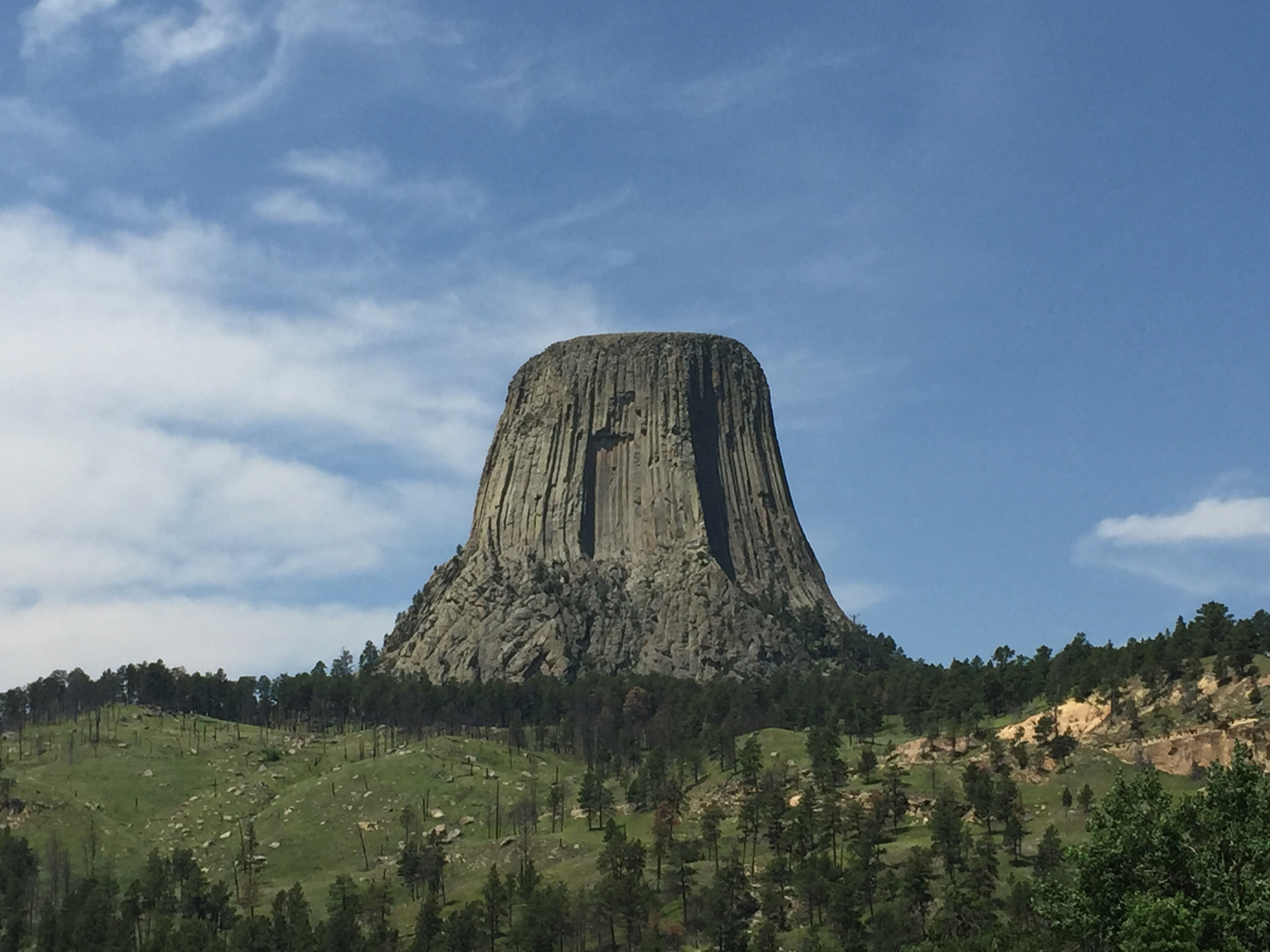
Devils Tower

The geology of Wyoming includes some of the oldest Archean rocks in North America, overlain by thick marine and terrestrial sediments formed during the Paleozoic, Mesozoic and Cenozoic, including oil, gas and coal deposits. Throughout its geologic history, Wyoming has been uplifted several times during the formation of the Rocky Mountains, which produced complicated faulting that traps hydrocarbons.

== Geologic history, stratigraphy and tectonics ==
The Precambrian crystalline basement rocks of Wyoming include schist and gneiss in the Wyoming Craton, which formed during the Archean beginning 3. 6 billion years ago. The Wyoming Craton was sutured together with the Superior Craton and Hearne Craton during the Trans-Hudson Orogeny. The Wyoming Craton was a separate continent until it joined the proto-North American continent Laurentia 1.86 billion years ago.

Along its southern margin, the Wyoming Craton is faulted against younger Proterozoic rocks from 1.7 billion years ago, which form the Front Range, extending into Colorado. The Mullen Creek-Nash Fork fault zone extends northeast to the Black Hills.

=== Paleozoic (539-251 million years ago) ===
Shallow tropical seas dominated Wyoming during the Paleozoic. The Cambrian Gros Ventre Formation is made up of shale and limestone, overlain by the Ordovician Bighorn Dolomite and the Mississippian Madison Limestone. Small unconformities appear in the stratigraphic record due to periodic erosion or lack of deposition on the Wyoming shelf. During the Pennsylvanian, the uplift of the ancestral Rocky Mountains began, with a prong known as the Pathfinder uplift extending into Wyoming. However, most of the region was draped in erosion deposits, forming the Tensleep Sandstone.

=== Mesozoic (251-66 million years ago) ===
More terrestrial conditions prevailed in the Mesozoic, with the deposition of Triassic red bed formations and mudstone in rivers, which bear well-preserved dinosaur fossils. During the Cretaceous, a renewed marine transgression produced the Western Interior Seaway forming sandstone and the thick, organic-rich Thermopolis Shale, Mowry Shale and Cody Shale, which are a major source of oil.

=== Cenozoic (66 million years ago-present) ===
Dryland conditions have continued since the end of the Cretaceous, through the Cenozoic and the Laramide orogeny uplifted the Rocky Mountains through the Eocene. Wyoming has numerous Laramide orogeny-related thrust faults, which form the Wind River Range, Bighorn Range and Laramie Range, with more ductile sedimentary rocks folded over Precambrian igneous rocks at the core of each range. This foreland deformation is particularly visible in Clarks Fork Canyon, the Beartooth Range and the Gros Ventre Range.

Large quantities of oil and gas are held beneath the anticline formations formed by the west dipping, low angle faults of the overthrust belt. Large coal beds formed as highlands eroded throughout the Paleocene, burying organic material. In the Fort Union Formation, coal beds are as much as 100 feet thick.

Lake Gosiute and Lake Uinta were playa lakes in the Eocene, that accumulated the oil shale Green River Formation, which include numerous fossils visible at Fossil Butte National Monument.

In the Shirley Basin, south of Casper, Wyoming, the Wind River Formation has a brilliant white color imparted by rhyolite ash fall in the Oligocene, Miocene and Pliocene from volcanic eruptions further west in the Basin and Range Province. Young Cenozoic rocks are well preserved in a downfaulted area in the Sweetwater Hills.

During the last 2.5 million years of the Quaternary continued uplift has accelerated erosion, as the Teton Range formed and the Yellowstone Caldera formed in its present location.
