= Great Lakes tectonic zone =

Geologic province

The Great Lakes tectonic zone (GLTZ) is bounded by South Dakota at its tip and heads northeast to south of Duluth, Minnesota, then heads east through northern Wisconsin, Marquette, Michigan, and then trends more northeasterly to skim the northernmost shores of lakes.

Algoman orogeny added landmass to the Superior province by volcanic activity and continental collision along a boundary that stretches from present-day South Dakota, U.S., into the Lake Huron region near Sudbury, Ontario, Canada.

It is 1,400 km (870 mi) long, and separates the older Archean gneissic terrane to the south from younger Late Archean greenstone-granite terrane to the north.

The zone is characterized by active compression during the Algoman orogeny (about 2,700 million years ago), a pulling-apart (extensional) tectonics (2,450 to 2,100 million years ago), a second compression during the Penokean orogeny (1,900 to 1,850 million years ago), a second extension during Middle Proterozoic time (1,600 million years ago) and minor reactivation during Phanerozoic time (the past 500 million years).

Collision began along the Great Lakes tectonic zone with the Algoman mountain-building event and continued for tens of millions of years. During the formation of the GLTZ, the gneissic Minnesota River Valley subprovince was thrust up onto the Superior province's edge as it consumed the Superior province's oceanic crust. Fragmentation of the Kenorland supercontinent began 2,450 million years ago and was completed by 2,100 million years ago. The Wyoming province is the continental landmass that is hypothesized to have rifted away from the southern Superior province portion of Kenorland, before moving rapidly west and docking with the Laurentia supercontinent 1,850 to 1,715 million years ago. Sedimentation from the GLTZ-rifting environment continued into the Penokean orogeny, which is the next major tectonic event in the Great Lakes region. Several earthquakes have been documented in Minnesota, Michigan's Upper Peninsula and Sudbury in the last 120 years along the GLTZ.

== Location ==
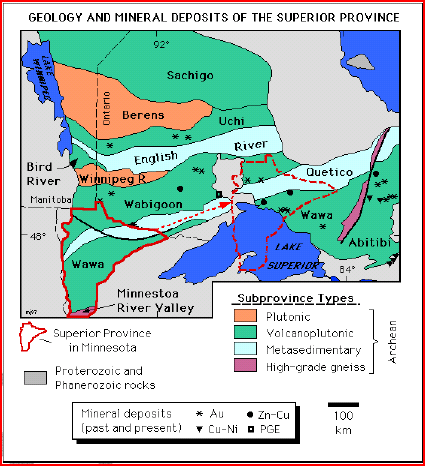
The Wawa subprovince is the wide green belt to the south; it is part of the Superior province. The Minnesota River Valley subprovince is also shown.

During the Late Archean Eon the Algoman orogeny – which occurred about 2,750 million years ago – added landmass through volcanic activity and continental collision along a boundary that stretches from present-day South Dakota, U.S., into the Sudbury, Ontario, Canada, region. The farthest west into South Dakota is 99°W, which is about 55 km (34 mi) from the Minnesota – South Dakota border. This crustal boundary is the Great Lakes tectonic zone (GLTZ). It is a 1,400 km (870 mi) long paleosuture that separates the more than 3,000-million-year-old Archean gneissic terrane to the south – Minnesota River Valley subprovince – from the 2,700-million-year-old Late Archean greenstone-granite terrane to the north – Wawa Subprovince of the Superior province. The GLTZ is 50 km (30 mi) wide.

== Mechanism ==
=== Collision ===
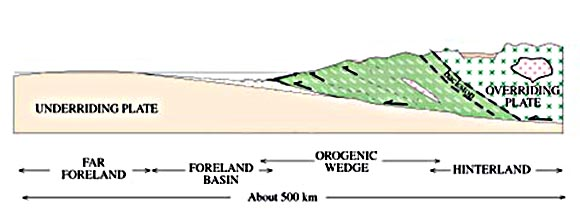
This diagram shows the dynamics of two colliding continental plates. The Superior province was underridden by the Minnesota River Valley subprovince plate.

The collision of the gneissic Minnesota River Valley (MRV) subprovince onto the southern edge of the Superior province was another process in the slow change in tectonics which marks the end of the Archean Eon. This gneissic terrane originally extended several hundred kilometers east to west, making it more of a protocontinent than a future Superior province belt. The boundary that separates the two colliding bodies is the Great Lakes tectonic zone; it is a fault zone of highly deformed rocks. Collision began along the GLTZ around 2,700 million years ago and continued for tens of millions of years. The collision is interpreted to have happened obliquely at an angle, beginning in the west.

=== Suturing ===
The MRV subprovince experienced two distinct high-grade metamorphic events, one 3,050 million years ago and the other 2,600 million years ago. The first was probably during formation of the terrane, the second was during suturing. The growth of the Superior province greenstone-granitic terranes ended with the suturing of the Minnesota River Valley gneiss terrane to the basaltic Wawa subprovince. Suturing, the last stage of closure, started in South Dakota and continued eastward.

During the formation of the GLTZ, the MRV protocontinent consumed the Superior province's oceanic crust as the subprovince came in from the south. Suturing of one continental block onto another usually occurs because a subduction zone exists beneath one of the blocks. The subduction zone consumes the oceanic crust connected to the other block. After the oceanic crust is consumed, the two blocks meet and the subducting oceanic crust pulls the attached continental block under the other. During the collision with the Superior province, the MRV gneissic block was thrust up onto the Superior province's edge; this resulted in a thrusted crumpled fault tens of kilometers wide producing a mountain range, and a shear zone which defines the boundary between the two terranes. Tectonism along the zone began during the docking of the two terranes into a single continental mass, and culminated in the early Proterozoic, where deformation took place under low to intermediate pressures.

=== Rifting ===
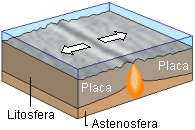
Hotspot causing rifting of tectonic plates

After suturing, the region was tectonically quiet for a few hundred million years. The Algoman Mountains had been built and then eroded into sediments that covered the area. Fragmentation of this Archean supercontinent began around 2,450 million years ago under a hotspot near Sudbury and was completed by around 2,100 million years ago. This is when the Wyoming province is hypothesized to have drifted away from the Superior province.

=== Cessation of rifting ===
The pattern of sedimentation from this rifting environment continued into the Penokean orogeny, which is the next major tectonic event in the Great Lakes region. During the Penokean orogeny (1,850 to 1,900 million years ago), compression deformed the sequences in the Lake Superior region.

== GLTZ in Marquette, Michigan, area ==
The pale yellow portion shows the Upper Peninsula (UP) of Michigan. Marquette is on the south shore of Lake Superior, straight north of the "'r' in the word 'Upper'".

In 1992 a report was published of geological mapping in the Marquette, Michigan, U.S., area which provided information of the structure for the zone along a 10 km (6.2 mi) strike. The GLTZ was an active dextral strike-slip zone south of Marquette, passing under the large Marquette anticline. The publication suggests that the kinematics determined in the exposed GLTZ – which are consistent – are applicable to its entire length.

In the Marquette area, the GLTZ is a northwest-striking zone of metamorphic rock about 2 km (1.2 mi) wide that was crushed by the dynamics of tectonic movements. Shear zone boundaries are subparallel and strike N60°W; the foliation in mylonite within the GLTZ strikes N70°W and dips S75°W. A stretching lineation (line of tectonic transport) in the mylonite foliation plunges 42° in a S43°E direction. In the Sims-and-Day model, this last collision in the assembly of the Superior province resulted from northwest-directed tectonic transport of the Minnesota River Valley subprovince terrane against the terrane of the Superior province. The collision was oblique, resulting in dextral-thrust shear along the boundary.

== Composition of rock ==
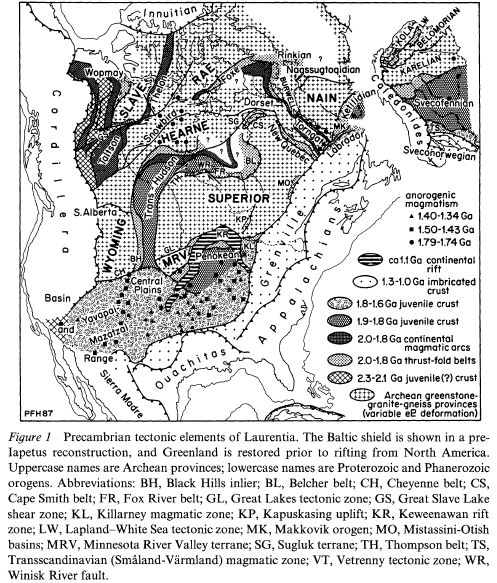
This map shows the locations of the Superior province, Penokean orogeny, Minnesota River Valley subprovince, Great Lakes tectonic zone (Minnesota's portion) and the present-day location of the Wyoming province.

Early Archean rocks generally form elongate, domal or circular bodies that are several kilometers thick. Late-stage dikes and sills of diabase, quartz-feldspar fine-grained instrusive rocks (aplite) and quartz-feldspar-mica coarse-grained intrusive rocks (pegmatite) are common.

Most of the region's crystalline rock bodies of Late Archean age are part of the greenstone-granite terrane of northern Minnesota, northwestern Wisconsin and the western part of the Upper Peninsula of Michigan. Lithologies of the rocks are usually gneissose and migmatitic. Repeated metamorphism and deformation caused extensive recrystallization, intense foliation, shear zones and folding. There are east-northeast- to east-trending faults in the gneissic rocks south of the Great Lakes tectonic zone in Minnesota, south of the Midcontinent Rift System in Wisconsin and in the Upper Peninsula of Michigan.

=== Minnesota ===
Crystalline rocks are more prominent in Minnesota, where they underlie 8,882 km^{2} (3,429 mi^{2}), than they are in either Wisconsin or Michigan's Upper Peninsula.

==== Montevideo and Morton gneiss complexes ====
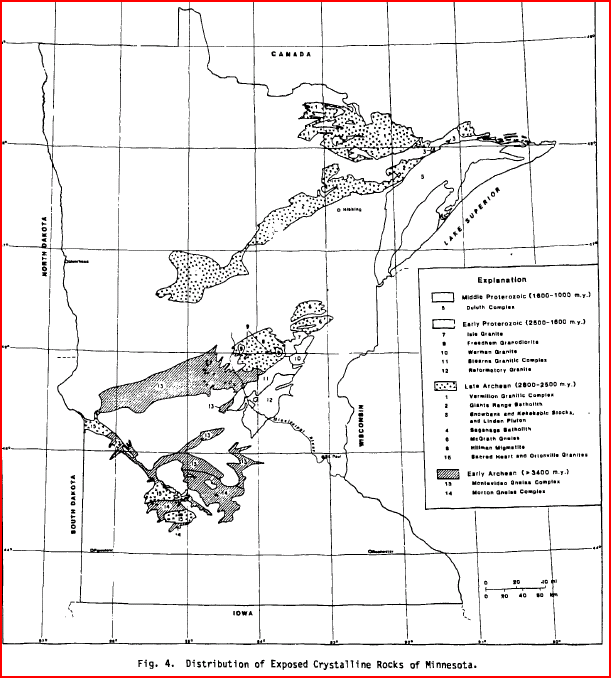
The Montevideo Gneiss Complex is No. 13 on the map and occurs in two separate gerrymandering places; one has a northwesterly orientation in west-central Minnesota and the other emplacement is south of the first one and has an east–west orientation. The Morton Gneiss Complex is No. 14 on the map with its northern edge contiguous to the southerly Montevideo portion and gerrymanders to the southwest. The Sacred Heart granite is No. 15 on the map; it is bisected by the Morton complex.

Recent radiometric age data indicates that there are four crystalline rock complexes 3,400 million years old in the Lake Superior region. The best-known units are the Morton Gneiss and the Montevideo Gneiss complexes, along the Minnesota River Valley in southwest Minnesota. Rocks exposed in the Minnesota River Valley include a complex of migmatitic granitic gneisses, schistose to gneissic amphibolite, metagabbro and paragneisses. The complex of ancient gneisses is intruded by a younger, weakly deformed granite body, the Sacred Heart granite.

==== Sacred Heart granitic bodies ====
The Sacred Heart granitic bodies that occur along portions of the Minnesota River Valley are relatively unfractured and unfoliated, and may represent passive intrusions into folded metasedimentary rocks. It is a typical late-tectonic medium-grained pink granite that was intruded around 2,600 million years ago, after the suturing of the MRV gneissic terrane onto the Superior province. Similar intrusions farther east along the GLTZ show later dates, reinforcing the theorized closure from west to east.

=== Northern Wisconsin ===
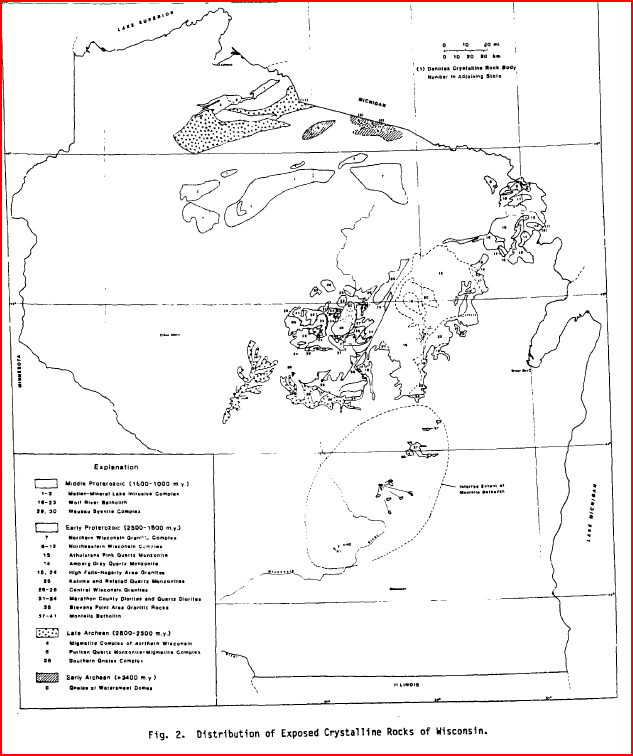
The Watersmeet Domes gneisses straddle the Wisconsin-Michigan border. (Note that the map scales are different for these three maps.) No. 11 is a quartz monzonite-migmatite complex which also straddles the border; it is northwest of the Watersmeet Domes and has a southwesterly orientation.

Late Archean lithologies in northwestern Wisconsin and the Upper Peninsula of Michigan are similar to the Sacred Heart granite and consist of gneisses and migmatites.

The 1,850-million-year-old Penokean magmatism in Wisconsin represents margin-type igneous activity terminated by collision. Some of the Penokean granites show iron enrichment similar to the magnetite series, rather than the low-oxygen concentration of the magnetic titanium oxides. Penokean-age rocks in the northern Wisconsin and the Upper Peninsula of Michigan contain areas of low-pressure, low- to high-temperature metamorphism. The folding and metamorphism increased in intensity to the south and southeast, and produced the isolated gneissic 1,755-million-year-old Watersmeet Domes which straddle the border of Michigan and northeastern Wisconsin.

=== Michigan's Upper Peninsula ===
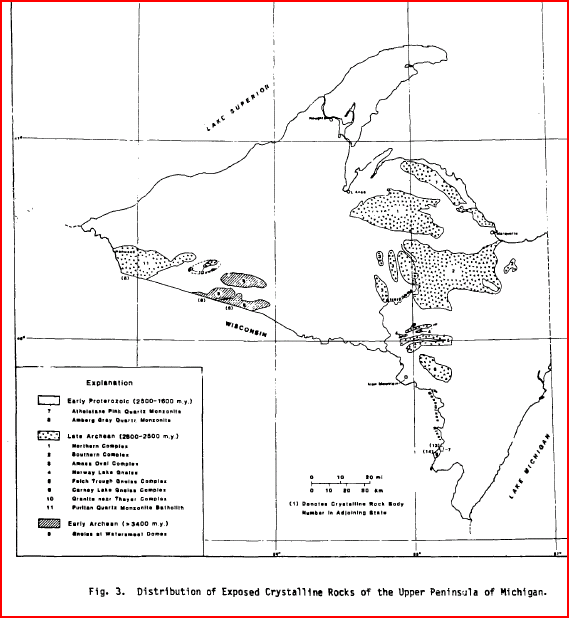
Marquette, Michigan, is on the eastern side of the map, on Lake Superior. The Northern complex is No. 1 on the map; it has three emplacements just northeast of Marquette. The Southern complex is No. 2 on the map and has one emplacement the just southwest of Marquette. On the Michigan-Wisconsin border are the Watersmeet Dome gneisses; they extend into Wisconsin.

Compressive deformation during the Penokean orogeny reactivated the GLTZ, which followed deposition of the Marquette Range Supergroup sediments and resulted in a north-side up motion along steep brittle-ductile faults in the eastern, low-grade portion of the Marquette Trough In the western portion of the Marquette syncline, a second episode of GLTZ reactivation took place during the uplift of the post-Huronian 2,400- to 2,100-million-year-old granitic Southern Complex.

The Northern and Southern complexes of the Upper Peninsula are highly migmatized and intensely foliated, with the intensity of foliation increasing toward margins. The western part of the Southern Complex shows intricate phases of folding and foliation. These Late Archean rocks form a roughly north–south belt lying south of Marquette extending to the Michigan-Wisconsin border.

=== Sudbury, Ontario ===
The Sudbury Basin structure is located in Greater Sudbury at the erosional boundary between the Archean Superior province and the overlying sequence of early Proterozoic continental margin deposits. (Note: The original url used showed the entire article as a PDF. It doesn't seem to work when the url is typed into Google. The url=ftp:// geo.igemi.troisk.ru/archive/Geophysics/geo2000/geo65n06/geo6506r18901899.pdf) The structure consists of the Sudbury Igneous Complex, a differentiated sequence of intrusive volcanic rocks – norite, gabbro and granophyre – overlain by breccias and metasedimenary rocks. The sublayer consists of a mass of basic to ultrabasic inclusions of varying size and frequency of occurrence. Sudbury gabbro varies between a gabbro and a norite, depending upon the local silicates' ratios. The quartz biotite gabbro is medium- to coarse-grained, the Climax quartz monzonite is medium-grained.

In the eastern Sudbury area the rock is highly crystalline hornblendic gneiss, which apparently dips at a rather low angle toward the southeast.

A paleostress analysis of the eastern exposures near Sudbury shows continuing dextral offset during the Penokean orogeny.

== Wyoming province separation hypothesis ==
=== General information ===
An episode of hotspot gabbro magmatism occurred 2,480 million years ago at the eastern edge of the Wyoming craton, south of current-day Sudbury. Continental rifting is exhibited by emplacement of mafic igneous rocks on each side of the rift margins. By 2,100 million years ago the Superior and Wyoming provinces had completely separated. From about 2,100 to 1,865 million years ago the Wyoming craton drifted in a westward direction until it docked 1,865 million years ago with the Superior province, northwest of its original position.

==== Before rifting ====
The final assembly of supercontinent Kenorland was finished by 2,600 to 2,550 million years ago; the southern Superior province – with the Minnesota River Valley subprovince attached – and the current-day southeastern border of the Wyoming province abutted each other from the Sudbury area westerly about 625 km (390 mi) to the Wisconsin-Michigan state line on Lake Superior. (Note: The distance measurements in the Wyoming province section are derived by the original author of this article with the use of three resources: 1.Geological Guidebook to the Paleoproterozoic East Bull Lake Intrusive Suite Plutons at East Bull Lake, Agnew Lake and River Valley, Ontario. Page 4 has a map with a scale given.2. Using that scale with landmarks on the maps from page 8 of the Dahl reference and 3. Mapquest. The original author arrived at approximate values using the scales, maps and a ruler. The geographic locations (Sudbury, Duluth, Wisconsin, etc.) given with the measurements are present-day locations.) The hotspot was 125 km (80 mi) south of the East Bull Lake suite, approximately under present-day Sudbury. The Blue Draw Metagabbros – in the Black Hills of South Dakota – were 625 km (390 mi) west of Sudbury and 150 km (90 mi) south of the westernmost contact of the two provinces on the Wyoming province.

==== During rifting ====
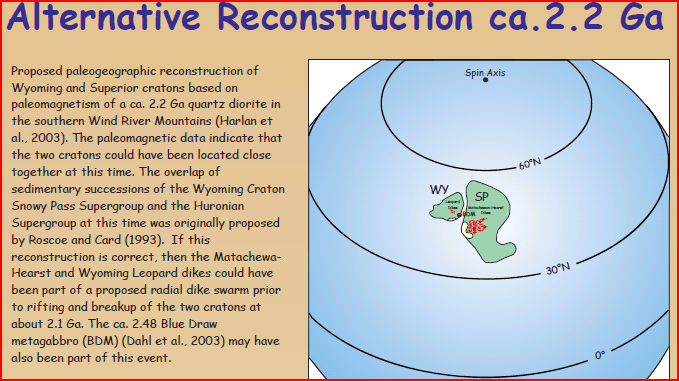
This shows a possible configuration for the attachment of the Wyoming and Superior provinces at 2,100 million years ago. Note the Blue Draw Metagabbro (BDM), marked by the red dot, on the Wyoming province.

The 2,170-million-year-old intrusive events that affected the Superior and the Wyoming cratons indicate that the plume had moved 330 km (210 mi) west, centered in the opening between the Superior province and the rifting Wyoming province. The Wyoming province was rotating away, with the Blue Draw Metagabbro being the pivot point. Harlan's reconstruction of this pivot is shown to the right. At this time the two provinces are in contact at only one point north of the Blue Draw Metagabbro; that point of contact was 875 km (540 mi) from Sudbury and 95 km (60 mi) southwest of Duluth, Minnesota. The Blue Draw Metagabbro is now 935 km (580 mi) west of Sudbury and remains about 150 km (90 mi) south of the Superior-Wyoming provinces' junction.

==== After complete separation ====
The 2,125- to 2,090-million-year-old mafic magmatic events affecting the Superior and Wyoming cratons show the hotspot having moved 500 km (310 mi) west from Sudbury, and the two provinces have rifted so that they are separated by 100 km (60 mi). That narrowest distance between the two cratons is 1,150 km (710 mi) from Sudbury, in east-central South Dakota. The Blue Draw Metagabbro is now 950 km (590 mi) west of Sudbury and 200 km (120 mi) south of the Superior province's southern border.

=== Supporting evidence ===
==== Before rifting ====
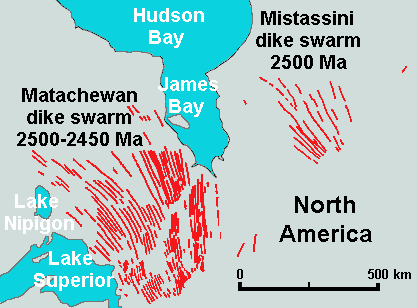
Matachewan Dike Swarms

Swarms of mafic dikes and sills are typical of continental rifting and can be used to time supercontinent breakup. Intrusion of the 2,475- to 2,445-million-year-old Matachewan-Hearst Mafic Dike Swarm and the 2,490- to 2,475-million-year-old East Bull Lake suite of layered mafic intrusive rocks are interpreted as indicating early Paleoproterozoic, mantle-hotspot driven rifting centered near Sudbury, Ontario, during the onset of Kenorland breakup. Radiometric dating shows that the Wyoming province's Blue Draw Metagabbro was undergoing rifting at 2,480 million years ago, the same time the emplacement of the 250 km (160 mi) long belt of mafic layered intrusions in the Sudbury region.

In the northern Black Hills of southwest South Dakota the 2,600- to 2,560-million-year-old Precambrian crystalline core, the Blue Draw Metagabbro, is a 1 km (0.62 mi) thick layered sill. The East Bull Lake intrusive suite, in the southern Superior province near Sudbury, Ontario, aligns spatially with the Blue Draw Metagabbro if the Superior and Wyoming cratons are restored to the Kenorland configuration proposed by Roscoe and Card (1993). These layered mafic intrusions are of similar thickness and identical age, and occur along a rifted belt.

Recent paleomagnetic and geochronological data from the central Wyoming craton support the hypothesis that the Huronian (in southern Ontario) and Snowy Pass (in southeastern Wyoming) supergroups were adjacent to each other at 2,170 million years ago and may have evolved as a single sedimentary rift basin between 2,450 and 2,100 million years ago. These Huronian and Snowy Pass sedimentary rocks are similar, each having 2,450- to 2,100-million-year-old epicratonic rifts succeeded by a 2,100- to 1,800-million-year-old passive sedimentary margins.

==== During rifting ====
Much of the southeastern Superior province was bisected by the more than 300,000 km^{2} (120,000 mi^{2}) 2,172- to 2,167-million-year-old Biscotasing Diabase Swarm which trended northeast from Sudbury. In southcentral Wyoming province there is a 2,170 ± 8-million-year-old quartz diorite dike of Wind River Range.

==== After complete separation ====
By 2,100 million years ago, the Wyoming craton is thought to have completely separated from the southern Superior province, this is consistent with the occurrence of a 2,076- to 2,067-million-year-old hotspot centered just south of the Superior province and east of the MRV. The 2,125- to 2,101-million-year-old Marathon and 2,077- to 2,076-million-year-old Fort Frances dikes, both on the present-day Superior province north of the Great Lakes tectonic zone, are consistent with rifting during this time period.

== Earthquakes ==
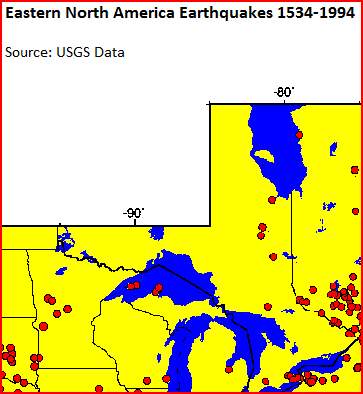
The red dots show larger-magnitude earthquakes in Minnesota, Wisconsin, Michigan's Upper Peninsula and southern Ontario. The earthquake near Minnesota's western "bulge" is the Morris earthquake.

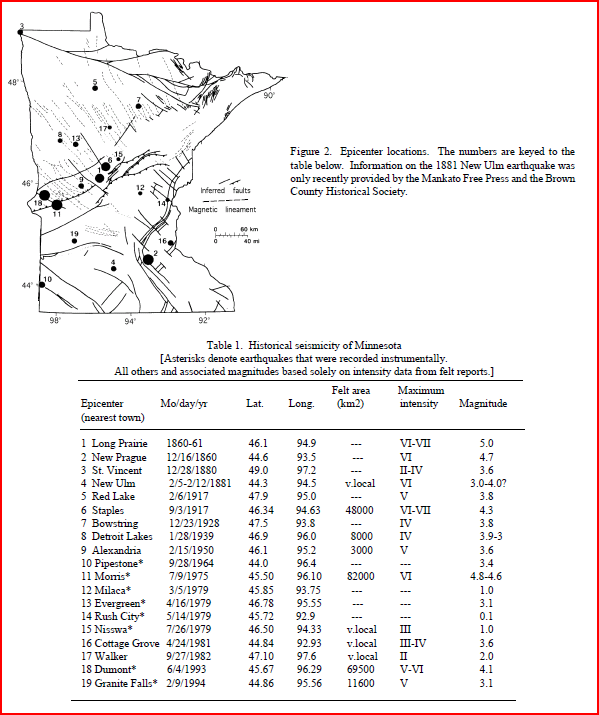
This map and table shows where Minnesota's earthquakes have occurred. Earthquakes 1, 6, 9, 11, 15 and 18 are in the Great Lakes tectonic zone. The size of the dot indicates the strength of the earthquake. The Morris earthquake is No. 11.

Minnesota has been the most seismically active in the region of Minnesota, Wisconsin, Michigan's Upper Peninsula and southern Ontario. Several earthquakes have been documented in Minnesota in the last 120 years, with at least six in the GLTZ. The epicenters show a clear relationship to tectonic features of the state; four epicenters lie along the Great Lakes tectonic zone. Depths are estimated at 5 to 20 km (3 to 12 mi). The best-documented event occurred on July 9, 1975, near Morris, Minnesota, with a magnitude of 4.6, and a felt area of 82,000 km^{2} (32,000 mi^{2}) covering parts of four states.

Wisconsin has had no earthquakes along the GLTZ, Michigan's Upper Peninsula has had four earthquakes in the vicinity of the GLTZ – Negaunee, Newberry and two in Sault Ste. Marie – and the Sudbury area has had three earthquakes.
