= Snowbird Tectonic Zone =

Geological structure in the western Canadian Shield

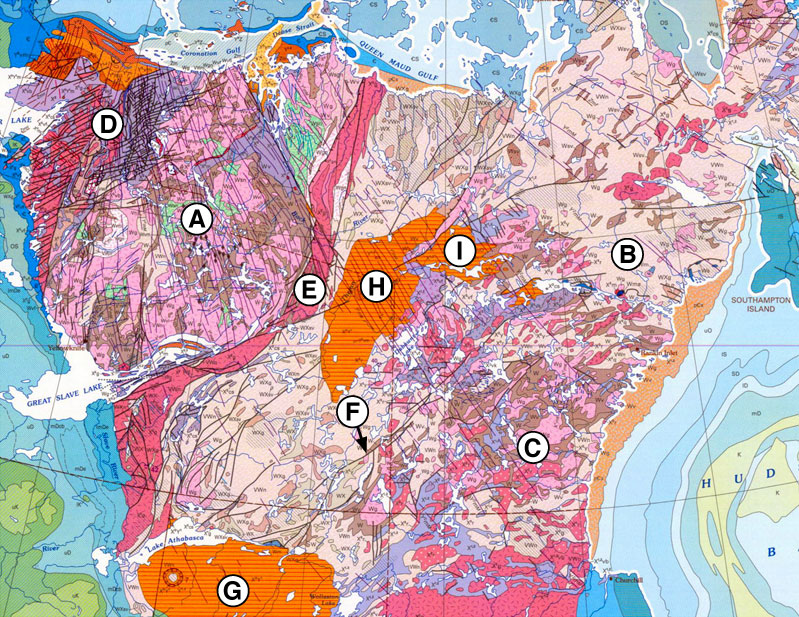
Geological map of north-western Canada. Snowbird Tectonic Zone marked F

The Snowbird Tectonic Zone (STZ) is a geological structure in the western Canadian Shield which forms a geophysical boundary between the Hearne craton and the south-west arm of the Rae craton. It is enigmatic and has been interpreted as a Proterozoic suture or escape structure, or an Archaean suture reactivated during either the Archaean or Palaeoproterozic. It stretches 2,800 km (1,700 mi) from the Canadian Cordillera north-east to Hudson Bay, diagonally crossing Alberta, Saskatchewan, the Northwest Territories, and Nunavut.

It truncates the Taltson magmatic zone in Alberta, which suggests an age younger than 1.95 Ga. In the Baker Basin (near Baker Lake, northern STZ) it is overlapped by lamprophyre dykes and volcanics, suggesting a minimum age of 1.85 Ga; however, a younger age (1.84–1.78 Ga) can be inferred from convergence across the STZ in Alberta.

Berman, Davis & Pehrsson 2007 interpreted it as part of the Hudsonian orogeny, a collisional event in which microcontinents were accreted to Laurentia around 1.85 Ga.

Using U-Pb dating, Baldwin et al. 2004 estimated the timing of eclogite facies metamorphism, a process which require transport to mantle depth, to 1.904 Ga. They, nevertheless, concluded that it remains unclear whether the STZ is a reactivated Archaean structure or a suture documenting the opening and closure of a Proterzoic ocean.
