= Taltson magmatic zone =

Belt of Archean to Paleoproterozoic rock in the Canadian Shield

- Magmatic arc
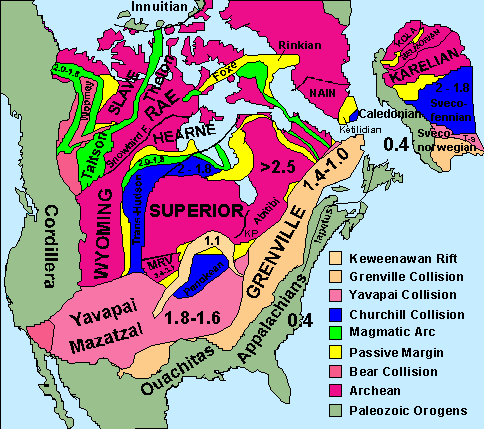
- Map of cratons and basement rock of North America. The Taltson magmatic zone is the north–south trending green line extending from the Wyoming craton in the south to the southeastern end of the Rae craton in the north.
- Location: Alberta, Canada

The Taltson magmatic zone (TMZ) is a north-trending belt of Archean to Paleoproterozoic granitic basement gneiss, amphibolite supracrustal gneissic rock and Paleoproterozoic magmatic rocks in the Canadian Shield, extending from Northern Alberta to the southwestern Northwest Territories. The TMZ basement is 3.2–3.0 Ga and the Rutledge River supracrustal gneisses 2.13–2.09 Ga years old and were intruded by magmatic rocks around 1.99–1.92 Ga.

The 300 km (190 mi) long exposed part of the TMZ in Northern Alberta and the Northwest Territories is bounded by the Great Slave Lake shear zone to the north and by the subsurface Snowbird Tectonic Zone to the south. TMZ is an Andean-type continental magmatic arc and an orogenic belt between the subsurface Buffalo Head terrane on the west and the Archean Churchill Province on the east. It is also the southern continuation of the Thelon magmatic zone, an orogenic belt between the Slave and Churchill cratons. The northern TMZ is divided by major faults and can be subdivided into two main terranes: an eastern gneiss framework and the TMZ batholiths in the west.

The exposed basement in northern Alberta is composed of banded gneissic rocks, predominantly 2.4–2.1 Ga metaplutonic gneissic rock, but it also contains amphibolitic gneiss and paragneiss. This basement also contains slices of Archean gneissic rock up to 3.73 Ga-old; an age similar to those of the Hearne and Rae cratons (also known as the Western Churchill Province), which can indicate that TMZ represents the recycling of parts of this province.

The U–Pb ages and the isotopic composition of TMZ and the Buffalo Head terrane (west of TMZ), including the Buffalo Head Hills kimberlite field, are identical. It is possible that these two domains represent a single Paleoproterozoic block. This block is composed mostly of contribution from depleted mantle sources but with contribution from the Churchill Province. TMZ basement rock together with the Buffalo Head terrane can represent the earliest Paleoproterzoic magmatism, pre-dating the break-up of the Churchill Province and the Taltson–Thelon orogeny.

== See also ==
- Great Bear magmatic zone
- Volcanism of Northern Canada
- Volcanism of Western Canada
