= Buffalo Head terrane =

Terrane in the western Canadian Shield in northern Alberta

The Buffalo Head terrane (BHT) is a terrane in the western Canadian Shield in northern Alberta. It is covered by 1,600 m (5,200 ft) of Devonian and Cretaceous sediments and its centre is intruded by the 88–86 Ma kimberlites of the diamondiferous Buffalo Head Hills kimberlite province.

== Geology ==
Because the BHT is covered by Phanerozoic rocks, its extent is uncertain and only known from aeromagnetic data and drill cores. To the south it is truncated by the Snowbird Tectonic Zone; to the north it is delimited by the Great Slave Lake Shear Zone; in the east it is separated from the Rae Craton by the 1.99–1.9 Ga Taltson magmatic zone; and in the west it is separated from the Nova Terrane by the magmatic rock of the Ksituan High. In its southern end the BHT is intruded by the Peace River Arch, a cratonic uplift active since the Proterozoic.

Ross 1990 defined the BHT as a broad, north-trending region of aeromagnetic anomalies. Drill cores from this region returned Zircon ages 2.324–1.993 Ga with occurrences of metaplutonic rocks in the range 1.999–1.993 Ga. From this Ross concluded that the BHT formed 2.32–2.0 Ga and was affected by a thermal-magnetic event 2.0–1.9 Ga.

The inherited age of the Proterzoic basement rocks is 2.4–2.1 Ga. The Rae craton is of similar age and isotopic signature which suggest it and the BHT formed a single crustal entity at 2.4 Ga. 2.34 Ga mafic to ultramafic rocks between BHT och Rae indicate separation by this time. BHT was then subducted at its eastern and western margins, which resulted in the arc magmatism that produced the Taltson magmatic zone 1980–1920 Ma and the 1986–1900 Ma Ksituan High.

== Kimberlite field ==
The Buffalo Head Hills kimberlite field is an atypical diamond deposit. The lack of indicator minerals such as harzburgitic garnet suggests a mantle composition different from those of other diamond occurrences. An unusual occurrence of Type II and Type IaB diamonds is indicative of a sub-lithospheric origin, such as a subducting oceanic slab, and the presence of a lherzolitic garnet suggests a formation depth of some 400 km (250 mi). 26 of the 38 kimberlite pipes in the Buffalo Head Hills kimberlite field are, nevertheless, diamondiferous. Drilling restricted to upper 200 m (660 ft) but the carrot-shaped kimberlite diatremes reach below the Proterzoic boundary and contain crater facies. The pipes range in size from 1 to 47 ha (2.5 to 116.1 acres).

== Sources ==
- Aulbach, S.; Griffin, W. L.; O'Reilly, S. Y.; McCandless, T. E. (2004). "Genesis and evolution of the lithospheric mantle beneath the Buffalo Head terrane, Alberta (Canada)" (PDF). Lithos. 77 (1): 413–451. doi:10.1016/j.lithos.2004.04.020.
- Banas, A.; Stachel, T.; Muehlenbachs, K.; McCandless, T. E. (2007). "Diamonds from the Buffalo Head Hills, Alberta: Formation in a non-conventional setting" (PDF). Lithos. 93 (1): 199–213. doi:10.1016/j.lithos.2006.07.001.
- O'connell, S. C. (1994). "Geological history of the Peace River arch" (PDF). In Mossop, G. D.; Shetsen, I. (eds.). Geological Atlas of the Western Canada Sedimentary Basin. Canadian Society of Petroleum Geologists and Alberta Research Council, Special Report, 4. pp. 431–438.
- Ross, G. M. (1990). "Deep crust and basement structure of the Peace River Arch region: constraints on mechanisms of formation". Bulletin of Canadian Petroleum Geology. 38 (1): 25–35.
- Skelton, D.; Clements, B.; McCandless, T. E.; Hood, C.; Aulbach, S.; Davies, R.; Boyer, L. P. (2003). "The Buffalo Head Hills kimberlite province, Alberta" (PDF). In Kjarsgaard, B. A. (ed.). Slave Province and northern Alberta field trip guidebook. Victoria. pp. 11–20.
