= Algoman orogeny =

Late Archaean episode of mountain building in what is now North America

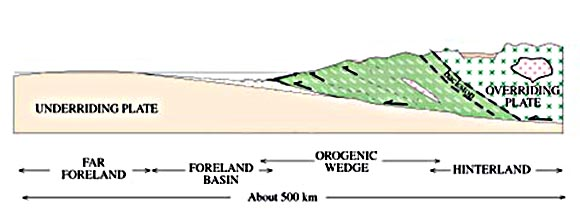
The Minnesota River Valley subprovince collided with and overrode the Superior province.

The Algoman orogeny, known as the Kenoran orogeny in Canada, was an episode of mountain-building (orogeny) during the Late Archean Eon that involved repeated episodes of continental collisions, compressions and subductions. The Superior province and the Minnesota River Valley terrane collided about 2,700 to 2,500 million years ago. The collision folded the Earth's crust and produced enough heat and pressure to metamorphose the rock. Blocks were added to the Superior province along a 1,200 km (750 mi) boundary that stretches from present-day eastern South Dakota into the Lake Huron area. The Algoman orogeny brought the Archean Eon to a close, about 2,500 million years ago; it lasted less than 100 million years and marks a major change in the development of the Earth's crust.

The Canadian Shield contains belts of metavolcanic and metasedimentary rocks formed by the action of metamorphism on volcanic and sedimentary rock. The areas between individual belts consist of granites or granitic gneisses that form fault zones. These two types of belts can be seen in the Wabigoon, Quetico and Wawa subprovinces; the Wabigoon and Wawa are of volcanic origin and the Quetico is of sedimentary origin. These three subprovinces lie linearly in southwestern- to northeastern-oriented belts about 140 km (90 mi) wide on the southern portion of the Superior Province.

The Slave province and portions of the Nain province were also affected. Between about 2,000 and 1,700 million years ago these combined with the Sask and Wyoming cratons to form the first supercontinent, the Kenorland supercontinent.

== Overview ==
Through most of the Archean Eon, the Earth had a heat production at least twice that of the present. The timing of initiation of plate tectonics is still debated, but if modern-day tectonics were operative in the Archean, higher heat fluxes might have caused tectonic processes to be more active. As a result, plates and continents may have been smaller. No broad blocks as old as 3 Ga are found in Precambrian shields. Toward the end of the Archean, however, some of these blocks or terranes came together to form larger blocks welded together by greenstone belts.

Two such terranes that now form part of the Canadian Shield collided about 2,700 to 2,500 million years ago. These were the Superior province and the large Minnesota River Valley terrane, the former composed mainly of granite and the latter of gneiss. This led to the mountain-building episode known as the Algoman orogeny in the U. S. (named for Algoma, Kewaunee County, Wisconsin), and the Kenoran orogeny in Canada. Its duration is estimated at 50 to 100 million years. The current boundary between these terranes is known as the Great Lakes tectonic zone (GLTZ). This zone is 50 km (30 mi) wide and extends in a line roughly 1,200 kilometers long from the middle of South Dakota, east through the middle of the Upper Peninsula of Michigan, into the Sudbury, Ontario region. The region remains slightly active today. Rifting in the GLTZ began about 2,500 million years ago at the end of the Algoman orogeny.

The orogeny affected adjacent regions of northern Minnesota and Ontario in the Superior province as well as the Slave and the eastern part of the Nain province, a far wider region of influence than in subsequent orogenies. It is the earliest datable orogeny in North America and brought the Archean Eon to a close. The end of the Archean Eon marks a major change in the development of the Earth's crust: the crust was essentially formed and achieved thicknesses of about 40 km (25 mi) under the continents.

== Tectonics ==
The collision between terranes folded the Earth's crust, and produced enough heat and pressure to metamorphose then-existing rock. Repeated continental collisions, compression along a north–south axis, and subduction resulted in the uprising of the Algoman Mountains. This was followed by intrusions of granite plutons and batholithic domes within the gneisses about 2,700 million years ago; two examples are the Sacred Heart granite of southwestern Minnesota and the Watersmeet Domes metagabbros (metamorphosed gabbros) that straddle the border of Wisconsin and Michigan's Upper Peninsula. After the intrusions solidified, new stresses on the greenstone belt caused movement horizontally along several faults and moved huge blocks of the crust vertically relative to adjacent blocks. This combination of folding, intrusion and faulting built mountain ranges throughout northern Minnesota, northern Wisconsin, Michigan's Upper Peninsula and southernmost Ontario. Igneous and high-grade metamorphic rocks are associated with the orogeny.

By extrapolating the now-eroded and tilted beds upward, geologists have determined that these mountains were several kilometers high. Similar projections of the tilted beds downward, coupled with geophysical measurements on the greenstone belts in Canada, suggest the metavolcanic and metasedimentary rocks of the belts project downward at least a few kilometers.

=== Greenstone ===
The action of metamorphism on the border between granite and gneiss bodies produces a succession of metamorphosed volcanic and sedimentary rocks called greenstone belts. Most Archean volcanic rocks are concentrated within greenstone belts; the green color comes from minerals, such as chlorite, epidote and actinolite that formed during metamorphism. After metamorphism occurred, these rocks were folded and faulted into a system of mountains by the Algoman orogeny.

The volcanic beds are 8 to 9 km (26,000 to 30,000 ft) thick. About 2,700 million years ago the greenstone belt was subjected to new stresses that caused movement along several faults. Faulting on both small and large scales is typical of greenstone belt deformation. These faults show both vertical and horizontal movement relative to adjacent blocks. Large-scale faults typically occur along the margins of the greenstone belts where they are in contact with enclosed granitic rocks. Vertical movement may be thousands of meters and horizontal movements of many kilometers occur along some fault zones.

Some time before 2,600 million years ago, masses of magma intruded under and within the igneous and sedimentary rocks, heating and pressing the rocks to metamorphose them into hard greenish greenstones. They began with fissure eruptions of basalt, continued with intermediate and felsic rocks erupted from volcanic centers and ended with deposition of sediments from the erosion of the volcanic pile. The rising magma was extruded under a shallow ancient sea where it cooled to form pillowed greenstones. Some of Minnesota's pillows probably cooled at depths as great as 1,000 m (3,300 ft) and contain no gas cavities or vesicles.

Most greenstone belts, with all of their components, have been folded into troughlike synclines; the original basaltic rock, which was on the bottom, occurs on the outer margins of the trough. The overlying, younger rock units – rhyolites and greywackes – occur closer to the center of the syncline. The rocks are so intensely folded that most have been tilted nearly 90°, with the tops of layers on one side of the synclinal belt facing those on the other side; the rock sequences are in effect lying on their sides. The folding can be so complex that a single layer may be exposed at the surface many times by subsequent erosion.

=== Volcanic activity ===
As the greenstone belts were forming, volcanoes ejected tephra into the air which settled as sediments to become compacted into the greywackes and mudstones of the Knife Lake and Lake Vermilion formations. Greywackes are poorly sorted mixtures of clay, mica and quartz that may be derived from the decomposition of pyroclastic debris; the presence of this debris suggests that some explosive volcanic activity had occurred in the area earlier. The volcanism took place on the surface and the other deformations took place at various depths. Numerous earthquakes accompanied the volcanism and faulting.

== Superior province ==
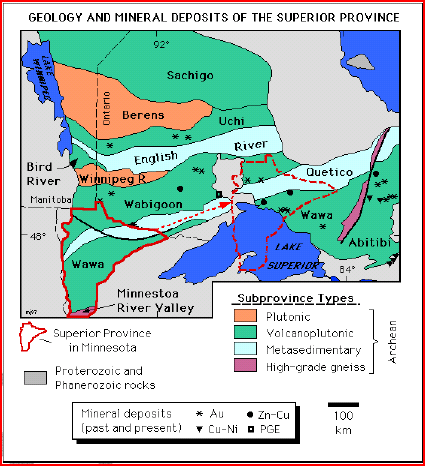
Wawa, Quetico and Wabigoon subprovinces

The Superior province forms the core of both the North American continent and the Canadian shield, and has a thickness of at least 250 km (160 mi). Its granites date from 2,700 to 2,500 million years ago. It was formed by the welding together of many small terranes, the ages of which decrease away from the nucleus. This progression is illustrated by the age of the Wabigoon, Quetico and Wawa subprovinces, discussed in their individual sections. Later terranes docked on the periphery of continental masses with geosynclines developing between the fused nuclei and oceanic crust. In general the Superior province consists of east–west-trending belts of predominately volcanic rocks alternating with belts of sedimentary and gneissic rocks.

Due to down warping along elongate zones, each belt is essentially a large downfold or downfaulted block. The areas between individual belts are fault zones consisting of granite or granitic gneiss. Its western part contains a regional pattern of east–west-trending 100 to 200 km (60 to 120 mi) wide granitic greenstone and metasedimentary belts (subprovinces). Western Superior province's mantle has remained intact since the 2,700-million-year-ago accretion of the subprovinces.

Both folding and faulting can be seen in the Wabigoon, Quetico and Wawa subprovinces. These three subprovinces lie linearly in southwestern- to northeastern-oriented belts of about 140 km (90 mi) wide (see figure on right). The northernmost and widest province is the Wabigoon. It begins in north-central Minnesota and continues northeasterly into central Ontario; it is partially interrupted by the Southern province. Immediately to the south, the Quetico subprovince extends as far west in north-central Minnesota, and extends further to the northeast. It is completely interrupted by a narrow band of the 1,100- to 1,550-million-year-old Southern province to the northeast of Thunder Bay. The Wawa subprovince is the most southerly of the three; it begins in central Minnesota, continues northeast to Thunder Bay, Ontario, Canada, (where its southern border just skims north Thunder Bay) and then extends east beyond Lake Superior. The northern boundary continues in a roughly northeasterly heading, while the southern border dips south to follow the northeast shore of Lake Superior.

=== Fault zones ===
The three subprovinces are separated by steeply dipping shear zones caused by continued compression that occurred during the Algoman orogeny. These boundaries are major fault zones.

The boundary between the Wabigoon and Quetico subprovinces seems to have been also controlled by colliding plates and subsequent transpressions. This Rainy Lake – Seine River fault zone is a major northeast–southwest trending strike-slip fault zone; it trends N80°E to cut through the northwest part of Voyageurs National Park in Minnesota and extends westward to near International Falls, Minnesota and Fort Frances, Ontario. The fault has transported rocks in the greenstone belt a considerable distance from their origin. The greenstone belt is 2 to 3 km (0 to 0 mi) wide at the Seven Sisters Islands; to the west the greenstone interfingers with pods of anorthositic gabbro. Radiometric dating from the Rainy Lake area in Ontario show an age of about 2,700 million years old, which favors a moving tectonic plate model for the formation of the boundary.

The largest fault is the Vermilion fault separating the Quetico and Wawa subprovinces. It has a N40°E trend and was caused by the introduction of masses of magma. The Vermilion fault can be traced westward to North Dakota. It has had a 19 km (12 mi) horizontal movement with the northern block moving eastward and upward relative to the southern block. The junction between the Quetico and Wawa subprovinces has a zone of biotite-rich migmatite, a rock that has characteristics of both igneous and metamorphic processes; this indicates a zone of partial melting which is possible only under high temperature and pressure conditions. It is visible as a 500 m (1,600 ft) wide belt. Most of the flattened large crystals in the fault indicate a simple compression rather than a wrenching, shearing or rotational event as the two subprovinces docked. This provides evidence that the Quetico and Wawa subprovinces were joined by the collision of two continental plates, about 2,690 million years ago. Structures in the migmatite include folds and foliations; the foliations cut across both limbs of earlier-phase folds. These cross-cutting foliations indicate that the migmatite has undergone at least two periods of ductile deformation.

=== Wabigoon subprovince ===
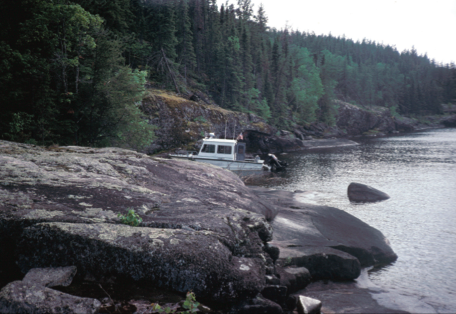
Precambrian rock in Voyageurs National park, which straddles the Wabigoon and Quetico subprovinces.

The Wabigoon subprovince is a formerly active volcanic island chain, made up of metavolcanic-metasedimentary intrusions. These metamorphosed rocks are volcanically derived greenstone belts, and are surrounded and cut by granitic plutons and batholiths. The subprovince's greenstone belts consist of felsic volcanics, felsic batholiths and felsic plutons aged from 3,000 to 2,670 million years old.

=== Quetico subprovince ===
The Quetico gneiss belt extends some 970 km (600 mi) across Ontario and parts of Minnesota. The dominant rocks within the belt are schists and gneisses produced by intense metamorphism of greywackes and minor amounts of other sedimentary rocks. The sediments, alkalic plutons and felsic plutons are aged from 2,690 to 2,680 million years. The metamorphism is relatively low-grade on the margins and high-grade in the center. The low-grade components of the greywackes were derived primarily from volcanic rocks; the high-grade rocks are coarser-grained and contain minerals that reflect higher temperatures. The granitic intrusions within the high-grade metasediments were produced by subduction of the ocean crust and partial melting of metasedimentary rocks. Immediately south of Voyageurs National Park and extending to the Vermilion fault is a broad transition zone that contains migmatite.

The Quetico gneiss belt represents an accretionary wedge that formed in a trench during the collision of several island arcs (greenstone belts). Boundaries between the gneiss belt and the flanking greenstone belts to the north and south are major fault zones, the Vermilion and Rainy Lake – Seine River fault zones.

=== Wawa subprovince ===
The Wawa subprovince is a formerly active volcanic island chain, consisting of metamorphosed greenstone belts which are surrounded by and cut by granitic plutons and batholiths. These greenstone belts consist of felsic volcanics, felsic batholiths, felsic plutons and sediments aged from 2,700 to 2,670 million years old.

The predominant rock type is a white, coarse-grained, foliated hornblende tonalite. Minerals in the tonalite are quartz, plagioclase, alkali feldspar and hornblende.

== Slave province ==
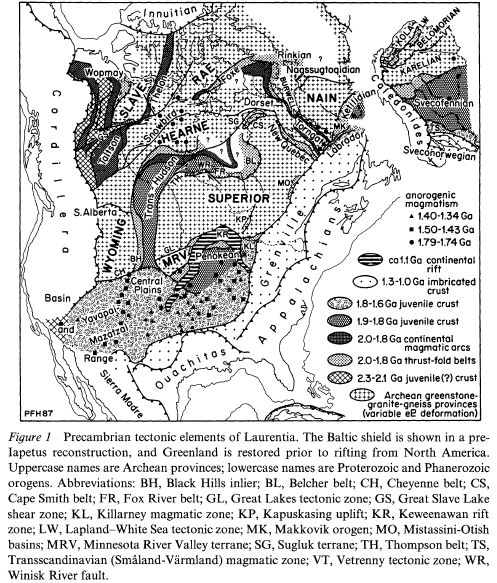
This shows the location of the Slave province to the northwest and the Nain province to the northeast.

In extensive regions of the Slave province of northern Canada, the magma that later became batholiths heated the surrounding rock to create metamorphic regions called aureoles about 2,575 million years ago. These regions are typically 10 to 15 km (6 to 9 mi) wide. The creation of aureoles was a continuous process, but three recognizable metamorphic phases can be correlated with established deformational phases. The cycle began with a deformation phase unaccompanied by metamorphism. This evolved into the second phase accompanied by broad regional metamorphism as thermal doming began. With continued updoming of the isotherms, the third phase produced minor folding but caused major metamorphic recrystallization, resulting in the emplacement of granite at the core of the thermal dome. This phase occurred at lower pressure because of erosional unloading, but the temperatures were more extreme, ranging up to about 700 °C (1,300 °F). With deformation complete, the thermal dome decayed; minor mineralogical changes occurred during this decay phase. The region has since been effectively stable.

Geochronology of several Archean rock units establishes a sequence of events, approximately 75 million years in duration, leading to the formation of a new crustal segment. The oldest rocks, at 2,650 million years old, are basic metavolcanics with largely calc-alkaline characteristics. Radiometric dating indicates ages of 2,640 to 2,620 million years are recorded for the syn-kinematic quartz diorite batholiths and 2,590 to 2,100 million years for the major late-kinematic bodies. Pegmatitic adamellites, at 2,575±25 million years, are the youngest plutonic units.

Metagreywackes and metapelites from two areas traversing one of these aureoles near Yellowknife have been studied. Most of the Slave province rocks are granitic with metamorphosed Yellowknife metasedimentary and volcanic rocks. Isotopic ages of these rocks is around 2,500 million years ago, the time of the Kenoran orogeny. Rocks comprising the Slave province represent a high grade of metamorphism, intrusion and basement remobilization typical of Archean terranes. Migmatites, batholithic intrusive and granulitic metamorphic rocks show foliation and compositional banding; the rocks are uniformly hard and so thoroughly deformed that little foliation exists. Most Yellowknife Supergroup metasediments are tightly folded (isoclinal) or occur in plunging anticlines.

== Nain province ==
The Archean rocks forming the Nain province of northeastern Canada and Greenland are separated from the Superior terrane by a narrow band of remobilized rocks. Greenland separated from North America less than 100 million years ago and its Precambrian terranes align with Canada's on the opposite side of Baffin Bay. The southern tip of Greenland is part of the Nain Province, this means it was connected to North America at the end of the Kenoran orogen.

== See also ==
- Superior Craton – Large crustal block in North America
