= Hearne Craton =

Craton in northern Canada

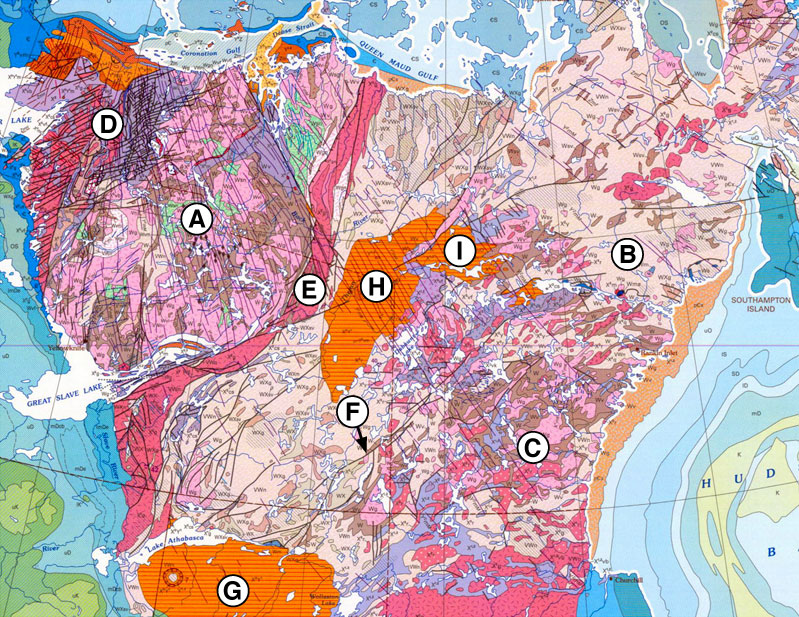
Geological map of north-western Canada. Hearne Craton marked with C.

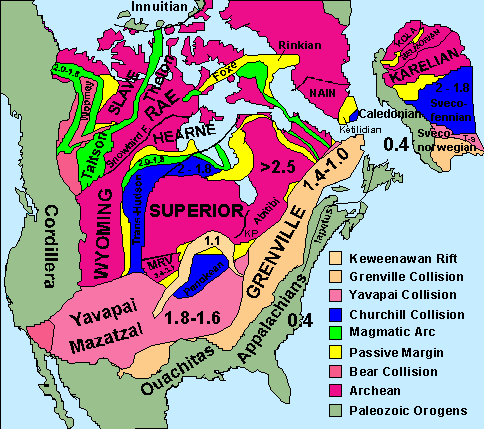
Palaeomap of North American and Scandinavian cratons, basement rocks, and orogenic belts

The Hearne Craton is a craton in northern Canada which, together with the Rae Craton, forms the Western Churchill Province. Hearne is one of the six Archaean cratons of the Canadian Shield (the other being Slave, Rae, Wyoming, Superior, Nain) that are bound together by Palaeoproterozoic orogenic belts. Before being merged these six cratons formed independent microcontinents.

== Geological setting ==
The Hearne Craton is separated from the Rae Craton by the 2,000 km (1,200 mi)-long Snowbird Tectonic Zone (STZ). During the Neoarchaean and Palaeoproterozoic the STZ played a major role when the Western Churchill Province was first assembled and then reworked. The STZ is a record of Neoarchaean plate tectonics similar in scale to modern orogenic belts.

When Laurentia formed at 2.0–1.7 Ga Hearne and Rae formed a central strip to which the Slave, Superior, and Wyoming cratons were accreted. This strip is bounded by a series of orogens: the 1.92–1.69 Ga Trans-Hudson to the south, the 2.0–1.9 Ga Taltson–Thelon and the 1.97–1.84 Ga Wopmey to the west. Hearne and Rae were extensively reworked during the assembly of Laurentia and overlain by Palaeoproterozoic cover sequences. On Hearne the most extensive such cover sequence is a series of continental and marine deposits known as the Hurwitz Group, a series of north-east-trending belts that cover 150,000 km^{2} (58,000 sq mi). A synclinoria infolded with Archaean basement in central Hearne has a fold-train with a wavelength of 35–45 km (22–28 mi). In the south-western Hearne continental siliciclastic rocks known as the Kiyuk Group overlie the Hurwitz Group. Both groups are covered by a thick cover of thrusts and folds.

== Manikewan Ocean ==
The Manikewan Ocean, a palaeocean named by Stauffer 1984, started to open along the south-east margin of Hearne at 2.075 Ga and had reached a width of 5,000 km (3,100 mi) after a hundred million years. Intra-oceanic arc collision resulted in the Amisk Collage and the Flin Flon – Glennie Complex around 1.92–1.88 Ga. Today these Palaeoproterzoic structures in the Trans-Hudson Orogen welds the Archaean Hearne and the Superior cratons. As the ocean continued to close, an Andean-style arc pluton known as the Wathaman Batholith formed 1.86–1.85 Ga. The subduction of the Manikewan Ocean stopped when the La Ronge Arc collided with Hearne. The final closure of the ocean around 1.83 Ga, when Hearne, Superior, and Sask cratons merged with the Flin Flon – Glennie Complex, was followed by a period of metamorphism that peaked around 1.82–1.8 Ga. The Manikewan Mobile Belt now covers an area of 600,000 km^{2} (230,000 sq mi) but is overlain by Middle Proterozoic Athabasca sandstone.
