= 1975 Morris earthquake =

Earthquake in Minnesota, United States

- Location within the United States
- UTC time: 1975-07-09 14:54:15
- ISC event: 726019
- USGS-ANSS: ComCat
- Local date: July 9, 1975
- Local time: 9:54
- Magnitude: 4.6 M_{n}
- Depth: 5.0 mi (8 km)
- Epicenter: 45.5°N 96.1°W
- Areas affected: Minnesota, United States
- Max. intensity: MMI VI (Strong)

The 1975 Morris earthquake occurred in western Minnesota on July 9 at 14:54:15 UTC, or 9:54 a.m. local time. The strongest instrumentally recorded rupture in the history of the state, it registered at magnitude 4.6 M_{n} and had a maximum Mercalli intensity of VI (Strong). It was the first earthquake to be recorded on any seismic instrument in the state since 1917. Tremors were felt over much of Minnesota, northern Iowa, and the eastern Dakotas.

== Setting ==
Minnesota is not a very tectonically active state but there is at least one fault zone in it, the Great Lakes Tectonic Zone, stretching from Big Stone County and Traverse County to Duluth. Seven earthquakes have occurred along the fault, the two largest being the Morris quake and the Staples event of 1917. Plotting of the earthquakes suggests that there may be another hidden fault in the state somewhat adjacent to it.

== Damage ==
The earthquake caused moderate damage and was defined as intensity VI on the Mercalli intensity scale. Minor damage to walls and basement foundations was reported around the epicenter in Stevens County. Damage consisted of cracked plaster, falling items, and pictures being knocked off walls. The quake also cracked the foundations of two homes on East Fifth Street in Morris. Many reports included extremely loud "bangs" and "explosions". These sounds led one to man think that a nearby gas plant had exploded. It was the most intense earthquake recorded in the region; had it occurred in a more populated area it may have caused a larger amount of damage.

== See also ==
- List of earthquakes in 1975
- List of earthquakes in the United States
