= Laurentia =

Craton forming the geological core of North America

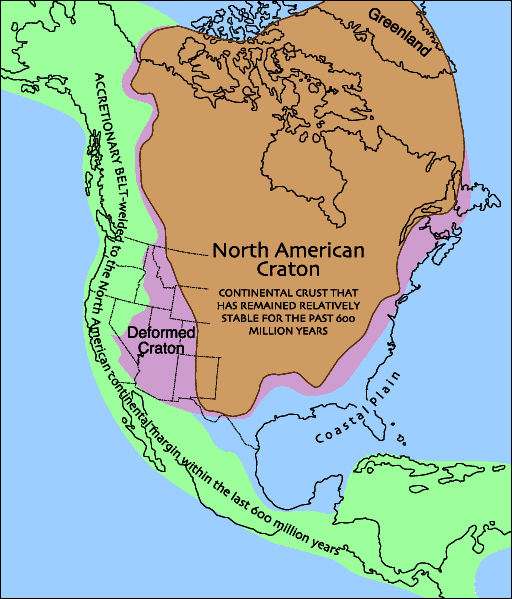
Laurentia basement rocks

Laurentia or the North American craton is a large continental craton that forms the ancient geological core of North America. Many times in its past, Laurentia has been a separate continent, as it is now in the form of North America, although originally it also included the cratonic areas of Greenland and the Hebridean terrane in northwest Scotland. During other times in its past, Laurentia has been part of larger continents and supercontinents and consists of many smaller terranes assembled on a network of early Proterozoic orogenic belts. Small microcontinents and oceanic islands collided with and sutured onto the ever-growing Laurentia, and together formed the stable Precambrian craton seen today.

== Etymology ==
The craton is named after the Laurentian Shield, through the Laurentian Mountains, which received their name from the St. Lawrence River, named after Saint Lawrence of Rome.

== Interior platform ==
In eastern and central Canada, much of the stable craton is exposed at the surface as the Canadian Shield, an area of Precambrian rock covering over a million square miles. This includes some of the oldest rock on Earth, such as the Archean rock of the Acasta Gneiss, which is 4.04 billion years (Ga) old, and the Istaq Gneiss Complex of Greenland, which is 3.8 Ga. When subsurface extensions are considered, the wider term Laurentian Shield is more common, not least because large parts of the structure extend outside Canada. In the United States, the craton bedrock is covered with sedimentary rocks on the broad interior platform in the Midwest and Great Plains regions and is exposed only in northern Minnesota, Wisconsin, the New York Adirondacks, and the Upper Peninsula of Michigan. The sequence of sedimentary rocks varies from about 1,000 m to in excess of 6,100 m (3,500–20,000 ft) in thickness. The cratonic rocks are metamorphic or igneous with the overlying sedimentary layers composed mostly of limestones, sandstones, and shales. These sedimentary rocks were largely deposited 650–290 Ma.

The oldest bedrock, assigned to the Archean Slave, Rae, Hearne, Wyoming, Superior, and Nain Provinces, is located in the northern two thirds of Laurentia. During the Early Proterozoic they were covered by sediments, most of which has now been eroded away.

The Greenland shield formed part of Laurentia with the Northernmost part still connected to the Ellesmere Island area. Greenland is separated from the North American, Canadian island by the Nares Strait, which is a Pleistocene erosional feature. The strait is floored with continental crust and shows no indications of a thermal event or seaway tectonism. The Baffin Bay area and southward, however, is formed by oceanic crust creating a continental divide towards east from around 60 million years ago. Greenland is composed mostly of crust of Archean to Proterozoic age, with lower Paleocene shelf formations on its northern margin and Devonian to Paleogene formations on its western and eastern margins. The eastern and northern margins were heavily deformed during the Caledonian orogeny.

The Isua Greenstone Belt of western Greenland preserves oceanic crust containing sheeted dike complexes. These provide evidence to geologists that mid-ocean ridges existed 3.8 Ga. The Abitibi gold belt in the Superior Province is the largest greenstone belt in the Canadian Shield.

== Tectonic history ==
=== Assembly ===
Laurentia first assembled from six or seven large fragments of Archean crust at around 2.0 to 1.8 Gya. The assembly began when the Slave craton collided with the Rae-Hearne craton, and the Rae-Hearne craton collided shortly after with the Superior Craton. These then merged with several smaller fragments of Archean crust, including the Wyoming, Medicine Hat, Sask, Marshfield, and Nain blocks. This series of collisions raised the mountains of the Trans-Hudson orogenic belt, which likely were similar to the modern Himalayas, and the Wopmay orogen of northwest Canada. During the assembly of the core of Laurentia, banded iron formation was deposited in Michigan, Minnesota, and Labrador.

The resulting nucleus of Laurentia was mostly reworked Archean crust but with some juvenile crust in the form of volcanic arc belts. Juvenile crust is crust formed from magma freshly extracted from the Earth's mantle rather than recycled from older crustal rock. The intense mountain building of the Trans-Hudson orogeny formed thick, stable roots beneath the craton, possibly by a process of "kneading" that allowed low density material to move up and high density material to move down.

Over the next 900 million years, Laurentia grew by the accretion of island arcs and other juvenile crust and occasional fragments of older crust (such as the Mojave block). This accretion occurred along the southeastern margin of Laurentia, where there was a long-lived convergent plate boundary. Major accretion episodes included the Yavapai orogeny at 1.71 to 1.68 Gya, which welded the 1.8 to 1.7 Gya Yavapai province to Laurentia; the Mazatzal orogeny at 1.65 to 1.60 Gya, accreting the 1.71 to 1.65 Gya Mazatzal province; the Picuris orogeny at 1.49 to 1.45 Gya, which may have welded the 1.50 to 1.30 Gya Granite-Rhyolite province to Laurentia; and the Grenville orogeny at 1.30 to 0.95 Gya, which accreted the 1.30 to 1.00 Gya Llano-Grenville province to Laurentia.

The Picuris orogeny, in particular, was characterized by the intrusion of great volumes of granitoid magma into the juvenile crust, which helped mature the crust and stitch it together. Slab rollback at 1.70 and 1.65 Gya deposited characteristic quartzite-rhyolite beds on the southern margin of the craton. This long episode of accretion doubled the size of Laurentia but produced craton underlain by relatively weak, hydrous, and fertile (ripe for extraction of magma) mantle lithosphere. The subduction under the southeast margin of the continent likely caused enrichment of the lithospheric mantle beneath the orogenic belts of the Grenville Province. Around 1.1 Gya, the center of the craton nearly rifted apart along the Midcontinent Rift System. This produced the Keweenawan Supergroup, whose flood basalts are rich in copper ore.

=== Formation and breakup of Rodinia ===
Laurentia was formed in a tectonically active world. The subduction under the southeast margin of the continent is thought to have contributed to the formation of Rodinia. According to the Southwest U.S. and East Antarctica or SWEAT hypothesis, Laurentia became the core of the supercontinent. It was rotated approximately 90 degrees clockwise compared with its modern orientation, with East Antarctica and Australia to the north (what is now the west), Siberia to the east (present north), Baltica and Amazonia to the south (present east), and Congo to the southwest (present southeast). The Grenville orogen extended along the entire southwest (present southeast) margin of Laurentia, where it had collided with Congo, Amazonia, and Baltica. Laurentia lay along the equator.

Recent evidence suggests that South America and Africa never quite joined to Rodinia, though they were located very close to it. Newer reconstructions place Laurentia closer to its present-day orientation, with East Antarctica and Australia to the west, South China to the northwest, Baltica to the east, and Amazonia and Rio de la Plata to the south.

The breakup of Rodinia began by 780 Ma, when numerous mafic dike swarms were emplaced in western Laurentia. Early stages of rifting produced the Belt Supergroup, which is over 12 kilometers (7.5 mi) thick. By 750 Ma the breakup was mostly complete, and Gondwana (composed of most of today's southern continents) had rotated away from Laurentia, which was left isolated near the equator. The breakup of Rodinia may have triggered an episode of severe ice ages (the Snowball Earth hypothesis.)

=== Pannotia and after ===
Pannotia 545 Ma, view centred on the South Pole.

There is some evidence that the fragments of Rodinia gathered into another short-lived supercontinent, Pannotia, at the very end of the Proterozoic. This continent broke up again almost at once, and Laurentia rifted away from South America at around 565 Ma to once again become an isolated continent near the equator, separated from Gondwana by the western Iapetus Ocean. Sometime in the early Cambrian, around 530 Ma, Argentina rifted away from Laurentia and accreted onto Gondwana.

The breakup of Pannotia produced six major continents: Laurentia, Baltica, Kazakhstania, Siberia, China, and Gondwana. Laurentia remained an independent continent until the middle Silurian. During the early to middle Ordovician, several volcanic arcs collided with Laurentia along what is now the Atlantic coast of North America. This caused an episode of mountain-building called the Taconic orogeny. As the mountains raised by the Taconic orogeny were subsequently eroded, they produced the immense Queenston Delta, recorded in the rocks of the Queenston Formation. There was also violent volcanic activity, including the eruption that produced the Millburg/Big Bentonite ash bed. About 1,140 cubic kilometers (270 cu mi) of ash erupted in this event. However, this does not seem to have triggered any mass extinction.

Throughout the early Paleozoic, Laurentia was characterized by a tectonically stable interior flooded by the seas, with marginal orogenic belts. An important feature was the Transcontinental Arch, which ran southwest from the lowlands of the Canadian Shield. The shield and the arch were the only portions of the continent that were above water through much of the early Paleozoic. There were two major marine transgressions (episodes of continental flooding) during the early Paleozoic, the Sauk and the Tippecanoe. During this time, the Western Cordillera was a passive margin. Sedimentary rocks that were deposited on top of the basement complex were formed in a setting of quiet marine and river waters. The craton was covered by shallow, warm, tropical epicontinental or epicratonic sea (meaning literally "on the craton") that had maximum depths of only about 60 m (200 ft) at the shelf edge.

The position of the equator during the Late Ordovician epoch (c. 458 – c. 444 Ma) on Laurentia has been determined via extensive shell bed records. Flooding of the continent that occurred during the Ordovician provided the shallow warm waters for the success of sea life and therefore a spike in the carbonate shells of shellfish. Today the beds are composed of fossilized shells or massive-bedded Thalassinoides facies and loose shells or nonamalgamated brachiopod shell beds. These beds imply the presence of an equatorial climate belt that was hurricane free which lay inside 10° of the equator. This ecological conclusion matches the previous paleomagnetic findings which confirms this equatorial location.

=== Laurussia ===
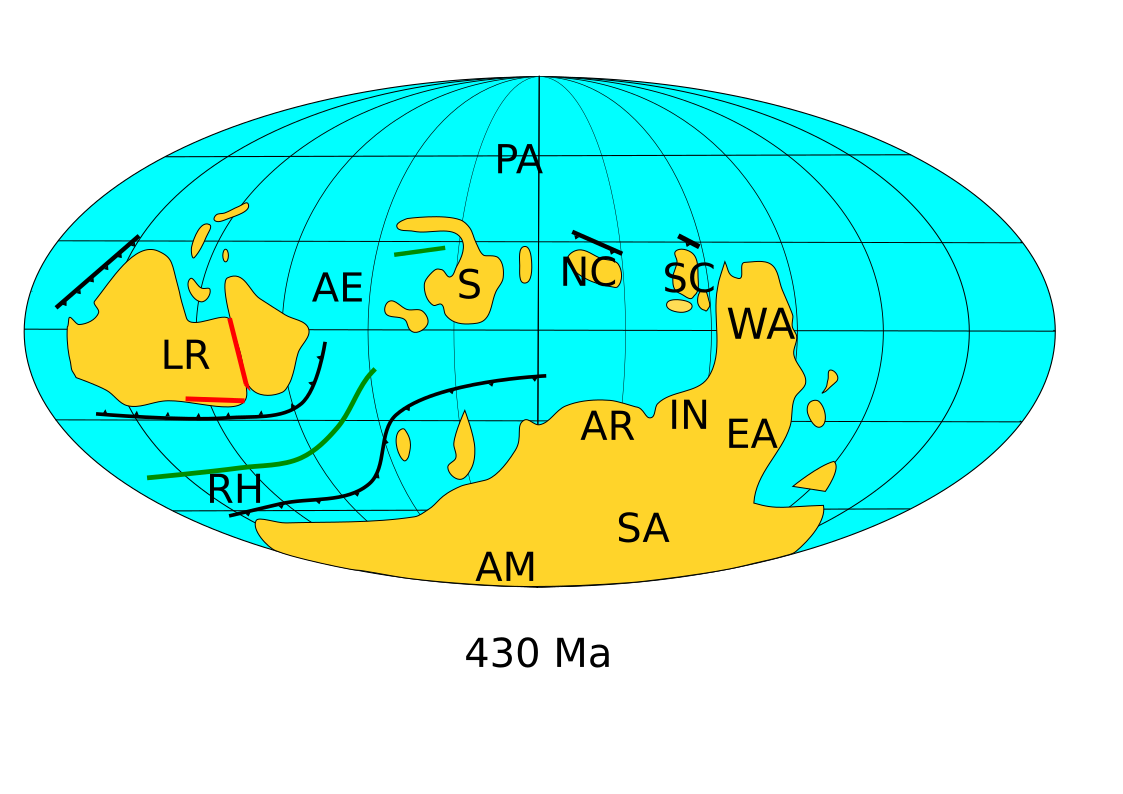
Paleogeography of Earth in the middle Silurian, around 430 Ma. Avalonia and Baltica have fused with Laurentia to form Laurussia.

At the end of the Cambrian, about 490 Mya, Avalonia rifted away from Gondwana. By the end of the Ordovician, Avalonia had merged with Baltica, and the two fused to Laurentia at the end of the Silurian (about 420 Ma) in the Caledonian orogeny. This produced the continent of Laurussia.

During this time, several small continental fragments merged with other margins of the craton. These included the North Slope of Alaska, which merged during the Early Devonian. Several small crust fragments accreted from the late Devonian through the Mesozoic to form the Western Cordillera.

The Western Cordillera became a convergent plate margin during the Ordovician, and the Transcontinental Arch became submerged, only to reappear in the Devonian. The Devonian also saw the deposition of the Chattanooga Shale and the Antler Orogeny in the Western Cordillera.

=== Formation of Pangaea ===
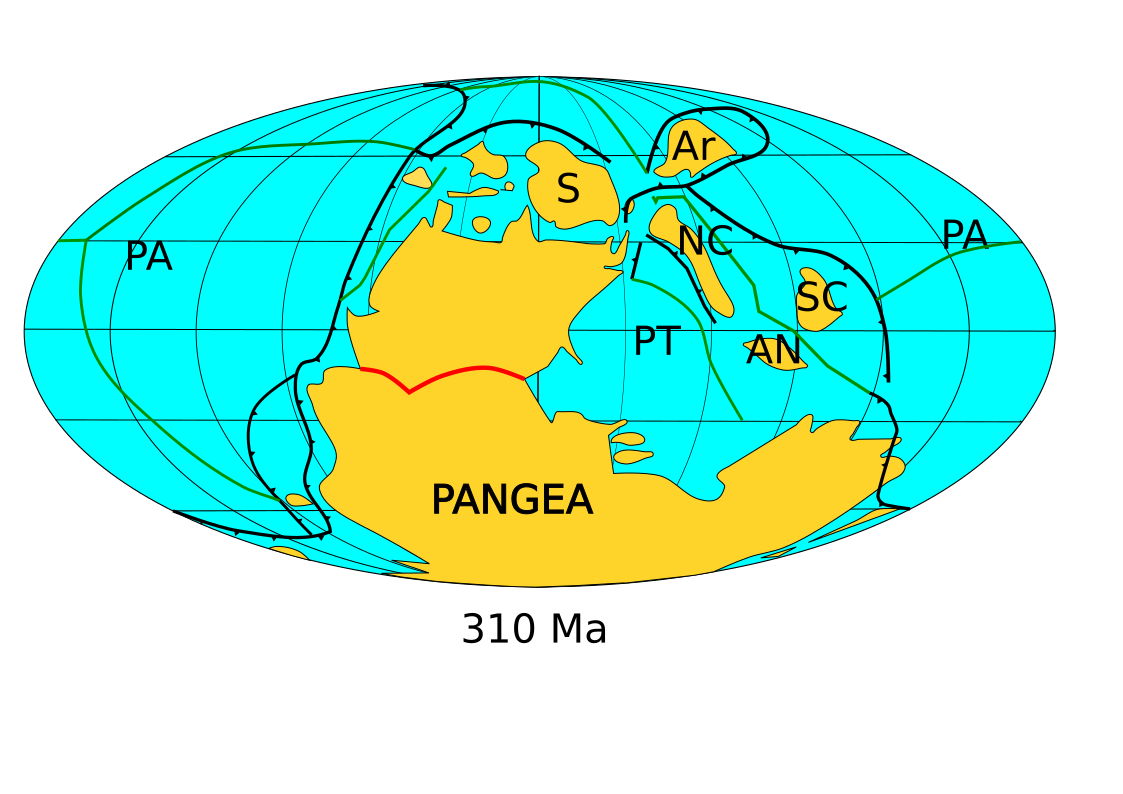
Paleogeography of Earth in the late Carboniferous, around 310 Ma. Laurussia has fused with Gondwana to form Pangea.

During the Carboniferous and Permian, Laurussia fused with Gondwana to form Pangaea. The resulting Alleghanian orogeny created the Central Pangean Mountains. The mountains were located close to the equator and produced a year-round zone of heavy precipitation that promoted the deposition of extensive coal beds, including the Appalachian coal beds in the U.S. Meanwhile, Gondwana had drifted onto the South Pole, and cycles of extensive glaciation produced a characteristic pattern of alternating marine and coal swamp beds called cyclothems.

During the Pennsylvanian, the Ancestral Rocky Mountains were raised in the southwestern part of Laurentia. This has been attributed either to either the collision with Gondwana or subduction under the continental margin from the southwest. Two additional marine transgressions took place during the late Paleozoic: the Kaskaskia and Absaroka.

The great continental mass of Pangaea strongly affected climate patterns. The Permian was relatively arid, and evaporites were deposited in the Permian Basin. Sedimentary beds deposited in the southwest in the early Triassic were fluvial in character, but gave way to eolian beds in the late Triassic. Pangaea reached its height about 250 Ma, at the start of the Triassic.

=== Breakup of Pangaea ===
The breakup of Pangaea began in the Triassic, with rifting along what is now the east coast of the U.S. that produced red beds, arkosic sandstone, and lake shale deposits. The central Atlantic ocean basin began opening at about 180 Ma. Florida, which had been a part of Gondwana before the assembly of Pangaea, was left with Laurentia during the opening of the central Atlantic. This former Gondwana fragment includes the Carolina Slate belt and parts of Alabama.

The Gulf of Mexico opened during the Late Triassic and Jurassic. This was accompanied by deposition of evaporite beds that later gave rise to salt domes that are important petroleum reservoirs today. Europe rifted away from North America between 140 and 120 Ma, and Laurentia once again became the core of an independent continent with the opening of the North Atlantic in the Paleogene.

Four orogenies occurred in the Mesozoic in the Western Cordillera: the Sonoma, Nevadan, Sevier, and Laramide. The Nevadan orogeny emplaced the extensive batholiths of the Sierra Nevada. The regression of the Sundance Sea in the late Jurassic was accompanied by deposition of the Morrison Formation, notable for its vertebrate fossils.

During Cretaceous times, the Western Interior Seaway ran from the Gulf of Mexico to the Arctic Ocean, dividing North America into eastern and western land masses. From time to time, land masses or mountain chains rose up on the distant edges of the craton and then eroded down, shedding their sand across the landscape. Chalk beds of the Niobrara Formation were deposited at this time, and accretion of crustal fragments continued along the Western Cordillera.

=== In the Cenozoic ===
Northeast Mexico was added to the North American craton relatively recently in geological time. This block was formed from the Mesozoic to nearly the present day, with only small fragments of earlier basement rock. It moved as a coherent unit after the breakup of Pangaea. The Atlantic and Gulf Coasts experienced eight transgressions in the Cenozoic. The Laramide orogeny continued to raise the present Rocky Mountains into the Paleocene. The Western Cordillera continued to suffer tectonic deformation, including the formation of the Basin and Range Province in the middle Cenozoic and the uplift of the Colorado Plateau. The Colorado Plateau was uplifted with remarkably little deformation. The flood basalts of the Columbia Plateau also erupted during the Cenozoic.

The southwestern portion of Laurentia consists of Precambrian basement rocks deformed by continental collisions. This area has been subjected to considerable rifting as the Basin and Range Province has been stretched up to 100% of its original width. The area experienced numerous large volcanic eruptions. Baja California rifted away from North America during the Miocene. This block of crust consists of Proterozoic to early Paleozoic shelf and Mesozoic arc volcano formations. The Holocene being an interglacial, a warm spell between episodes of extensive glaciation.

== Paleoenvironmental change ==
Several climate events occurred in Laurentia during the Phanerozoic eon. During the late Cambrian through the Ordovician, sea level fluctuated with ice cap melt. Nine macro scale fluctuations of "global hyper warming", or high intensity greenhouse gas conditions, occurred. Due to sea level fluctuation, these intervals led to mudstone deposits on Laurentia that act as a record of events. The late Ordovician brought a cooling period, although the extent of this cooling is still debated. More than 100 million years later, in the Permian, an overall warming trend occurred. As indicated by fossilized invertebrates, the western margin of Laurentia was affected by a lasting southward bound cool current. This current contrasted with waters warming in the Texas region. This opposition suggests that, during Permian global warm period, northern and northwestern Pangea (western Laurentia) remained relatively cool.

== Geological history ==
- Around 4.03 to 3.58 Ga, the oldest intact rock formation on the planet, the Acasta Gneiss, was formed in what is now Northwest Territories (older individual mineral grains are known, but not whole rocks).
- Around 2.565 Ga, Arctica formed as an independent continent.
- Around 2.72 to 2.45 Ga, Arctica was part of the supercontinent Kenorland.
- Around 2.1 to 1.84 Ga, when Kenorland broke apart, the Arctican craton was part of the landmass Nena along with Baltica and Eastern Antarctica.
- Around 1.82 Ga, Laurentia was part of the supercontinent Columbia.
- Around 1.35–1.3 Ga, Laurentia was an independent continent.
- Around 1.3 Ga, Laurentia was part of the landmass Protorodinia.
- Around 1.07 Ga, Laurentia was part of the supercontinent Rodinia.
- Around 750 Ma, Laurentia was part of the landmass Protolaurasia. Laurentia nearly rifted apart.
- In the Ediacaran (635 to 541 ±0.3 Ma), Laurentia was part of the supercontinent Pannotia.
- In the Cambrian (541 ±0.3 to 485.4 ±1.7 Ma), Laurentia was an independent continent.
- In the Ordovician (485.4 ± 1.7 to 443.8 ±1.5 Ma), Laurentia was shrinking and Baltica was expanding.
- In the Devonian (419.2 ± 2.8 to 358.9 ±2.5 Ma), Laurentia collided against Baltica, forming the landmass Euramerica.
- In the Permian (298.9 ± 0.8 to 252.17 ±0.4 Ma), all major continents collided against each other, forming the supercontinent Pangaea.
- In the Jurassic (201.3 ± 0.6 to 145 ±4 Ma), Pangaea rifted into two landmasses: Laurasia and Gondwana. Laurentia was part of the landmass Laurasia.
- In the Cretaceous (145 ± 4 to 66 Ma), Laurentia was an independent continent called North America.
- In the Neogene (23.03 ± 0.05 Ma until today or ending 2.588 Ma), Laurentia, in the form of North America, collided with South America, forming the landmass America.

== See also ==
- North Atlantic Craton – Archaean craton exposed in Greenland, Labrador, and northwestern Scotland
- Chronology of continents
