= Trans-Hudson orogeny =

Mountain-building event in North America

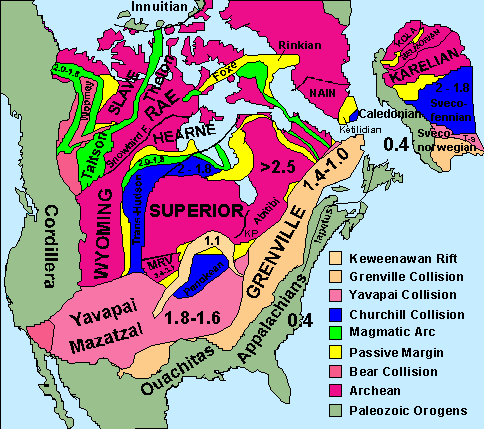
Trans-Hudson orogen (blue) surrounded by the Wyoming Hearne-Rae and Superior cratons (fuchsia) that constitute the central core of the North American Craton (Laurentia).

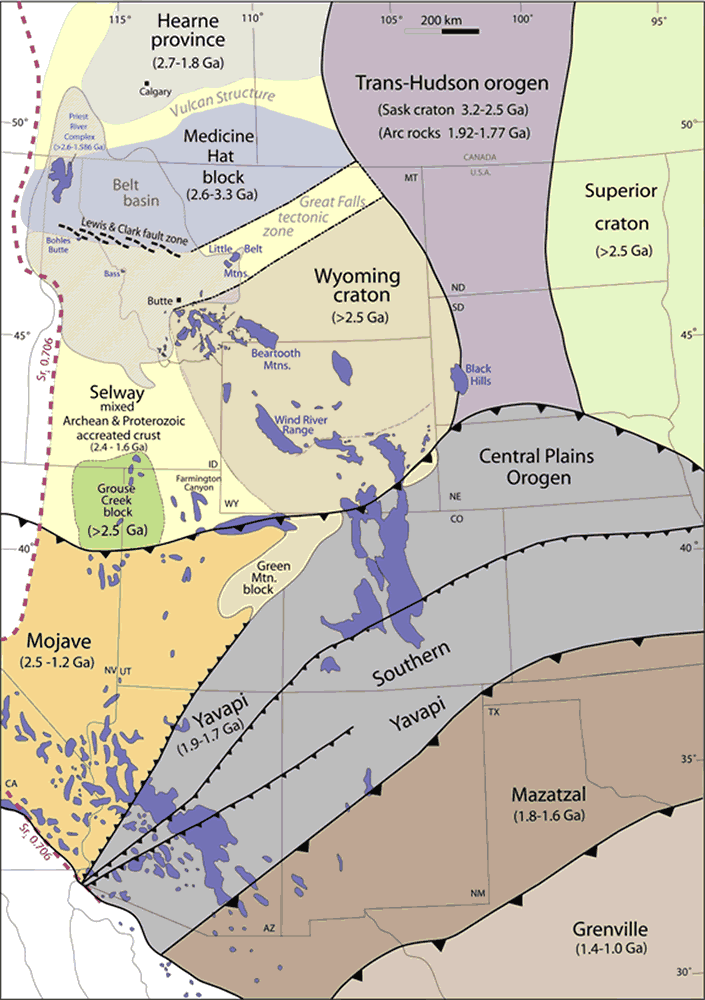
Trans-Hudson orogen and the Wyoming, Superior and Hearne cratons

The Trans-Hudson orogeny or Trans-Hudsonian orogeny was the major mountain building event (orogeny) that formed the Canadian Shield and the North American Craton. It gave rise to the Trans-Hudson orogen (THO), or Trans-Hudson Orogen Transect (THOT). It consists of a network of belts that were formed by Proterozoic crustal accretion and the collision of pre-existing Archean continents. The event occurred 2.0–1.8 billion years ago.

The Trans-Hudson orogen sutured together the Hearne, Superior, and other cratons to form a network of orogenic belts. These orogenic belts include the margins of microcontinents These old cratonic blocks, along with accreted island arc terranes and intraoceanic deposits from a Proterozoic ocean, were sutured together in the Trans-Hudson Orogen (THO).

The THO is a right-angled suture zone that extends eastward from Saskatchewan, through northern Quebec, parts of Labrador and Baffin Island, and all the way to Greenland. Westward it goes across Hudson Bay through Saskatchewan and then extends 90 degrees south through eastern Montana and the western Dakotas. (see Trans-Hudson Orogen map and the THOT Transect map). To the south, the orogen contributed to the subsurface Phanerozoic strata in Montana and the Dakotas that created the Great Plains.

== Overview ==
The Trans-Hudson orogeny resulted from the collision of the Superior Craton with the Hearne Craton, with the Archean microcontinent Sask Craton trapped in the THO interior.

The peaks of the Black Hills are 3,000–4,000 feet (910–1,220 m) above the surrounding plains, while Black Elk Peak – the highest point in South Dakota – has an altitude of 7,242 feet (2,207 m) above sea level. These are carved from metamorphic rocks.

== See also ==
- Labrador Trough
