= Shirley Basin, Wyoming =

Company-owned mining town

Coordinates: 42.298°N 106.204°W

Shirley Basin, Wyoming was a company-owned uranium-mining town located about 40 miles (64 km) south of Casper, Wyoming. The town was established in the 1960s, when Utah Mining, a subsidiary of Utah Construction Company began extracting uranium in the area. The company built a store and a school. After the Three Mile Island accident, the price of uranium dropped, forcing uranium-mining companies to scale back operations. Most of Shirley Basin's residents left in the next couple of years. The town's last resident left in 1992, and the townsite is abandoned today. There were approximately 200 slab sites for mobile homes. The streets were paved with curbs, sidewalks and street lights. As of 2020 there are a couple of abandoned trailer homes on the site and an old school bus. Very few out buildings remain.

== Climate ==
Climate data for Shirley Basin, Wyoming, 1991–2020 normals, 1978–2020 extremes: 7057ft (2151m)
Month	Jan	Feb	Mar	Apr	May	Jun	Jul	Aug	Sep	Oct	Nov	Dec	Year
Record high °F (°C)	54 (12)	54 (12)	68 (20)	75 (24)	82 (28)	93 (34)	96 (36)	95 (35)	88 (31)	80 (27)	64 (18)	56 (13)	96 (36)
Mean maximum °F (°C)	41.3 (5.2)	44.4 (6.9)	56.3 (13.5)	66.9 (19.4)	75.0 (23.9)	83.6 (28.7)	88.6 (31.4)	86.0 (30.0)	81.1 (27.3)	70.5 (21.4)	55.4 (13.0)	43.8 (6.6)	86.8 (30.4)
Mean daily maximum °F (°C)	28.1 (−2.2)	30.9 (−0.6)	40.8 (4.9)	49.6 (9.8)	60.2 (15.7)	72.6 (22.6)	81.1 (27.3)	79.5 (26.4)	69.1 (20.6)	54.1 (12.3)	39.6 (4.2)	29.1 (−1.6)	52.9 (11.6)
Daily mean °F (°C)	14.7 (−9.6)	17.6 (−8.0)	27.7 (−2.4)	36.5 (2.5)	46.1 (7.8)	56.0 (13.3)	63.5 (17.5)	61.3 (16.3)	51.4 (10.8)	38.7 (3.7)	26.6 (−3.0)	15.8 (−9.0)	38.0 (3.3)
Mean daily minimum °F (°C)	1.3 (−17.1)	4.2 (−15.4)	14.7 (−9.6)	23.5 (−4.7)	32.0 (0.0)	39.4 (4.1)	45.8 (7.7)	43.1 (6.2)	33.7 (0.9)	23.4 (−4.8)	13.5 (−10.3)	2.6 (−16.3)	23.1 (−4.9)
Mean minimum °F (°C)	−25.2 (−31.8)	−23.9 (−31.1)	−10.7 (−23.7)	4.6 (−15.2)	16.5 (−8.6)	27.1 (−2.7)	33.6 (0.9)	30.7 (−0.7)	19.1 (−7.2)	4.1 (−15.5)	−12.9 (−24.9)	−23.9 (−31.1)	−32.5 (−35.8)
Record low °F (°C)	−43 (−42)	−49 (−45)	−28 (−33)	−15 (−26)	0 (−18)	19 (−7)	26 (−3)	19 (−7)	2 (−17)	−13 (−25)	−32 (−36)	−39 (−39)	−49 (−45)
Average precipitation inches (mm)	0.50 (13)	0.62 (16)	0.80 (20)	1.29 (33)	1.83 (46)	1.35 (34)	1.30 (33)	0.83 (21)	0.93 (24)	0.80 (20)	0.43 (11)	0.43 (11)	11.11 (282)
Average snowfall inches (cm)	10.2 (26)	12.1 (31)	10.9 (28)	14.1 (36)	5.7 (14)	0.4 (1.0)	0.0 (0.0)	0.0 (0.0)	1.7 (4.3)	7.2 (18)	7.9 (20)	10.0 (25)	80.2 (203.3)
Source 1: NOAA
Source 2: XMACIS2 (1991-2018 snowfall, records & monthly max/mins)
