= Nain Province =

Part of the North Atlantic Craton in Labrador, Canada

Coordinates: 56.58°N 62.06°W

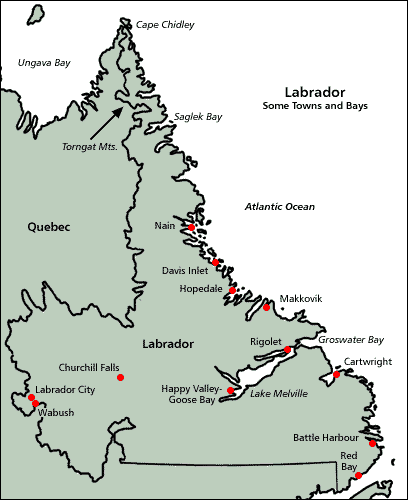
Note Saglek Bay, Nain and Hopedale

In Labrador, Canada, the North Atlantic Craton is known as the Nain Province. The Nain geologic province was intruded by the Nain Plutonic Suite, which divides the province into the northern Saglek block and the southern Hopedale block.

== North Atlantic Craton ==
The North Atlantic Craton is exposed in parts of the coast of Labrador, parts of central Greenland, the Scourian Complex of northwestern Scotland and is unexposed in northern Norway. The North Atlantic Craton fragmented 2450 to 2000 million years ago. When North America and Europe rejoined, the North Atlantic Craton was triangular shaped with each side 600 km (370 mi); this unit was separated when the Labrador Sea formed 61 to 40 million years ago. The crust of the North Atlantic Craton varies between 28 and 38 km (17 and 24 mi) thick and its rocks are 85% granitoid gneisses. The Nain Province was intruded by the 1350- to 1290-million-year-old Nain Plutonic Suite; composite anorthosite-granitic intrusions which divide the Nain Province into the northern Saglek Block and the southern Hopedale Block.

== Nain Province ==
In Labrador, the North Atlantic Craton is known as the Nain Province or Nain Craton. The Nain Province is more than 600 km (370 mi) long and 100 km (62 mi) wide. The gneisses of the Nain Province were last deformed and metamorphosed when two blocks docked together 2500 million years ago with a collisional boundary extending 200 km (120 mi) to the north and 150 km (93 mi) to the south of Nain, Labrador, Canada. These two blocks appear to represent two distinct Archean cratonic nuclei, each with its own mineral depositional history. Major granitic intrusions – the Wheeler Mountain, Halbach, Alliger, Sheet Hill, Loon Island, Red Island, and Satok Island intrusions – form a north-trending 150 km (93 mi) linear chain which have a southerly decrease in age – 2135-million-year-old Wheeler Mountain granite in the north to the 2025-million-year-old Satok Island monzonite in the south. The Nain Province was then intruded by the 1350- to 1290-million-year-old Nain Plutonic Suite; composite anorthosite-granitic intrusions which divide the Nain Province into the northern Saglek block and the southern Hopedale block. The Torngat orogen developed during the oblique convergence of the Superior and Nain Provinces 900 million years ago. The crystalline crust in the Nain Province is 38 km (24 mi) thick; it thins to 9 km (5.6 mi) thick in the shelf area of the Labrador margin, where it is covered with up to 8 km (5.0 mi) of sediments.

== Saglek block ==
The 3800- to 3300-million-year-old Saglek block is 375 km (233 mi) long and 50 km (31 mi) wide; it has a north-northwesterly trend from Nain, Labrador, extending nearly to the northern tip of Labrador. This block is a high-grade gneiss terrane; it has no greenstone belts. Within the gneiss are variably-sized enclaves ranging from anorthosite to ultramafic. There are also three small anorthositic, ultramafic meta-igneous complexes in the gneiss near Okak Bay.

The northward–trending Handy fault separates the Saglek block into two metamorphic parts. The gneiss complex on the western side of the Handy fault has rocks that crystallized under granulite facies conditions; this western block is more deeply exposed than the eastern one. On the eastern side amphibolite facies rocks are exposed in the northern part; they transition to granulite facies to the south. The total crustal thickness is 33 km (21 mi) north of the fault and 38 km (24 mi) south of the fault.

== Hopedale block ==
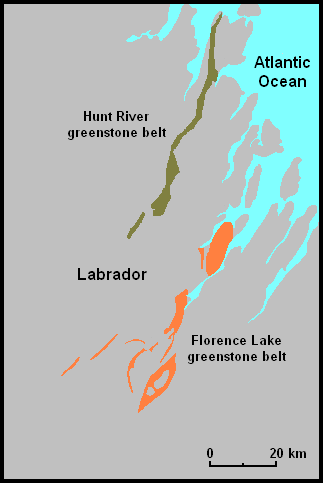
Hunt River and Florence Lake greenstone belts

The 3100- to 2800-million-year-old Hopedale block is 150 km (93 mi) long and 90 km (56 mi) wide. Hopedale, Labrador, is at the eastern midpoint. This block contains the 3100-million-year-old Hunt River and 3000-million-year-old Florence Lake greenstone belts, and the Weekes amphibolite which represents remnants of the older Hunt River greenstone belt.
