= Rae Craton =

Archean craton in northern Canada north of the Superior Craton

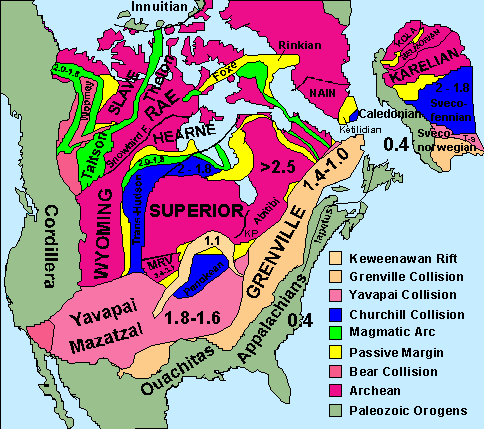
North America cratons and basement rock.

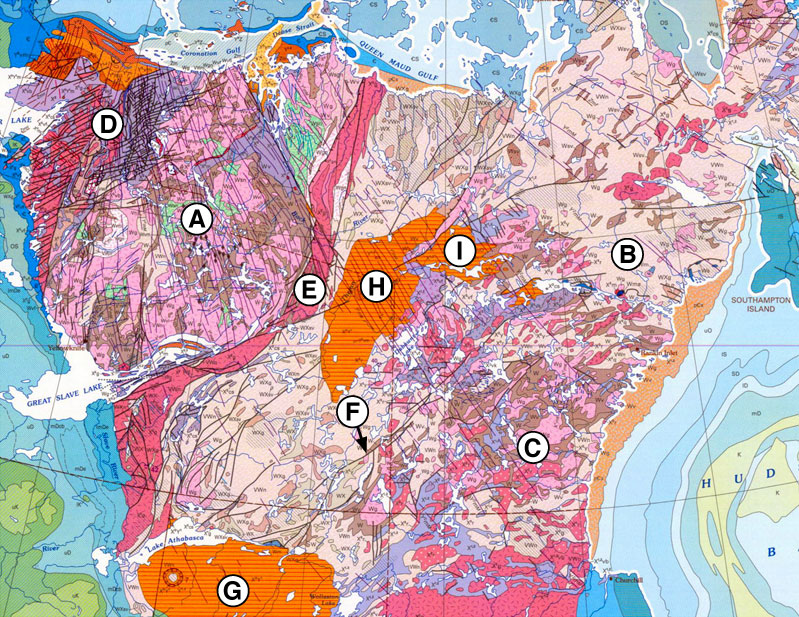
Geological map of north-western Canada. Rae Craton is marked with B.

The Rae Craton is an Archean craton located in northern Canada, north of the Superior Craton.

== Ungava Peninsula ==
The Ungava Peninsula, situated on the northeast portion of the Canadian Shield, is where the Rae Province connects with the Superior Province.

== See also ==
- Canadian Shield
- North American Craton
