= Superior Craton =

Large crustal block in North America

The Superior Craton is a stable crustal block covering Quebec, Ontario, southeast Manitoba in Canada, and northern Minnesota in the United States. The southeastern border is the Keweenawan Rift containing its namesake, Lake Superior. It is the biggest craton among those formed during the Archean period. A craton is a large part of the Earth's crust that has been stable and subjected to very little geological changes over a long time. The size of Superior Craton is about 1,572,000 km^{2}. The craton underwent a series of events from 4.3 to 2.57 Ga. These events included the growth, drifting and deformation of both oceanic and continental crusts.

Researchers have divided the Superior Craton into many different domains based on rock types and deformation styles. These domains (grouped into western and eastern superior provinces), include the North Superior Superterrane and Wawa Terrane, among others (shown in the table below).

Studies on the formation of the Superior Craton varied in progress between the western and the eastern part. For the western part, five major orogenies were involved. They include the Northern Superior Orogeny (2720 Ma), the Uchian Orogeny (2720–2700 Ma), the Central Superior Orogeny (2700 Ma), the Shebandowanian Orogeny (2690 Ma), and the Minnesotan Orogeny (2680 Ma). For the eastern part, two models are suggested. The first model by Percival and Skulski (2000) focuses on the collision between the terranes. The second model by Bédard (2003) and Bédard et al. (2003) focuses on the effect of an active anorogenic magmatic activity.

== Location ==
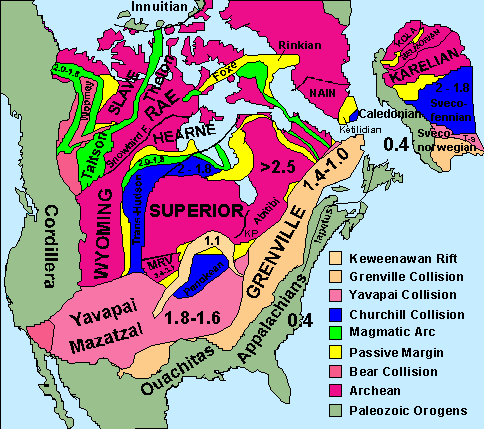
The western to the northeastern part of the craton is bounded by the Trans-Hudson orogens. The eastern and the southeastern side is neighbouring the Grenville orogens. The southern side is generally meeting the Keweenawan rift, while the southernmost tip of the craton in Minnesota is reaching the Central Plain orogen.

The Superior Craton covers central Canada; it occupies the northern and central part of Quebec, extending across the central and the southern part of Ontario, and also covers most of Manitoba and eastern North and South Dakota, with its tip reaching central South Dakota.

== Tectonic setting ==
The Archean Superior Craton extends over 1,572,000 km^{2} of the North American continent. Forming the core of the Canadian Shield, the Archean Superior craton is encompassed by early Proterozoic orogens. The western to the northeastern part of the craton is bound by the Trans-Hudson orogens. To the eastern and the southeastern side are the neighbouring Grenville orogens. The southeastern side meets the Keweenawan rift, which contains the Lake Superior, while the southernmost tip of the craton in Minnesota reaches the Central Plain orogen.

Regarding the faults, there are three major trends of subparallel faults slicing the craton into linear subprovinces. In the northwestern part, faulting occurs in a west–northwest direction. The northeastern part has northwest-trending faults. The faults in the remaining southern part possess an east–west direction.

== Growth history of the terranes ==
The craton-forming terranes are created from very diverse settings, such as oceanic arc, ancient forearc, oceanic tectonic melange, uplift within the craton, fold-thrust belt and extra. Common among them is that these features were mostly formed in a compression setting.

Some of the terranes were formed from the structures of a volcanic arc, including the volcanic arc chain and the forearc setting.

=== Oceanic arc setting ===
Some terranes, such as the Western Wabigoon Terrane, are formed from the setting of an oceanic arc. An oceanic arc is a chain of volcanoes which formed above and parallel to the subduction zones. Due to tectonic activities in the Earth, the relevant continental and oceanic crusts collided before 2.70 Ga. The denser oceanic crust subducted underneath the continental crust and melted into the mantle, which generated more magma. The huge amount of magma then rose up, penetrated through the crust above and erupted. The continuous eruption of volcanic material cooled down and accumulated around the centers of eruption, forming a chain of volcanoes in the shape of an arc.

=== Ancient forearc basin setting ===
Some terranes, such as the Quetico Terrane, were forearcs in the past. A forearc is the region between the volcanic arc and the subduction zone. It includes several components, including the subduction trench, the outer arc high of the oceanic crust, the accretionary wedges, and the sedimentary basin. The outer arc high is formed by the flexural upward motion of the oceanic crust edge before it enters the subduction zone. The accretionary wedges are formed from the accumulation of marine sediment scraped off from the oceanic crust before it is subducted. The sedimentary basin is formed from the accumulation of erosive material from the volcanoes, which lying flatly between the volcanoes and the topographic high of the accretionary wedge.

=== Uplift setting ===
Some terranes, such as the Kapuskasing Uplift, were formed from the uplifting of the crustal block. For example, during 1.85 Ga, the American Midcontinent and the Superior Craton collided. The collision between the two cratons triggered an Archean reverse fault, the Ivanhoe Lake fault. The upward movement of the hanging wall causes the uplift of a crustal block, known as the Kapuskasing Uplift.

Some terranes, such as the Pontiac Terrane, were previously a fold-thrust belt. A fold-thrust belt is a zone consisting of a series of thrusts (reverse faults) and fault-bend folds separated by main thrust faults.

=== Fold-thrust belt setting ===
Some terranes, such as the Pontiac Terrane, were previously a fold-thrust belt. A fold-thrust belt is a zone consisting of a series of thrusts (reverse faults) and fault-bend folds separated by main thrust faults. The fold-thrust belt is formed in a compression setting like crust collision. when the crust is compressed, thrusts dipping towards where the compression comes formed. The hanging walls of the thrusts slide up along the fault plane and stacks above the footwall, forming a ramp anticline or fault-bend fold.

=== General composition ===
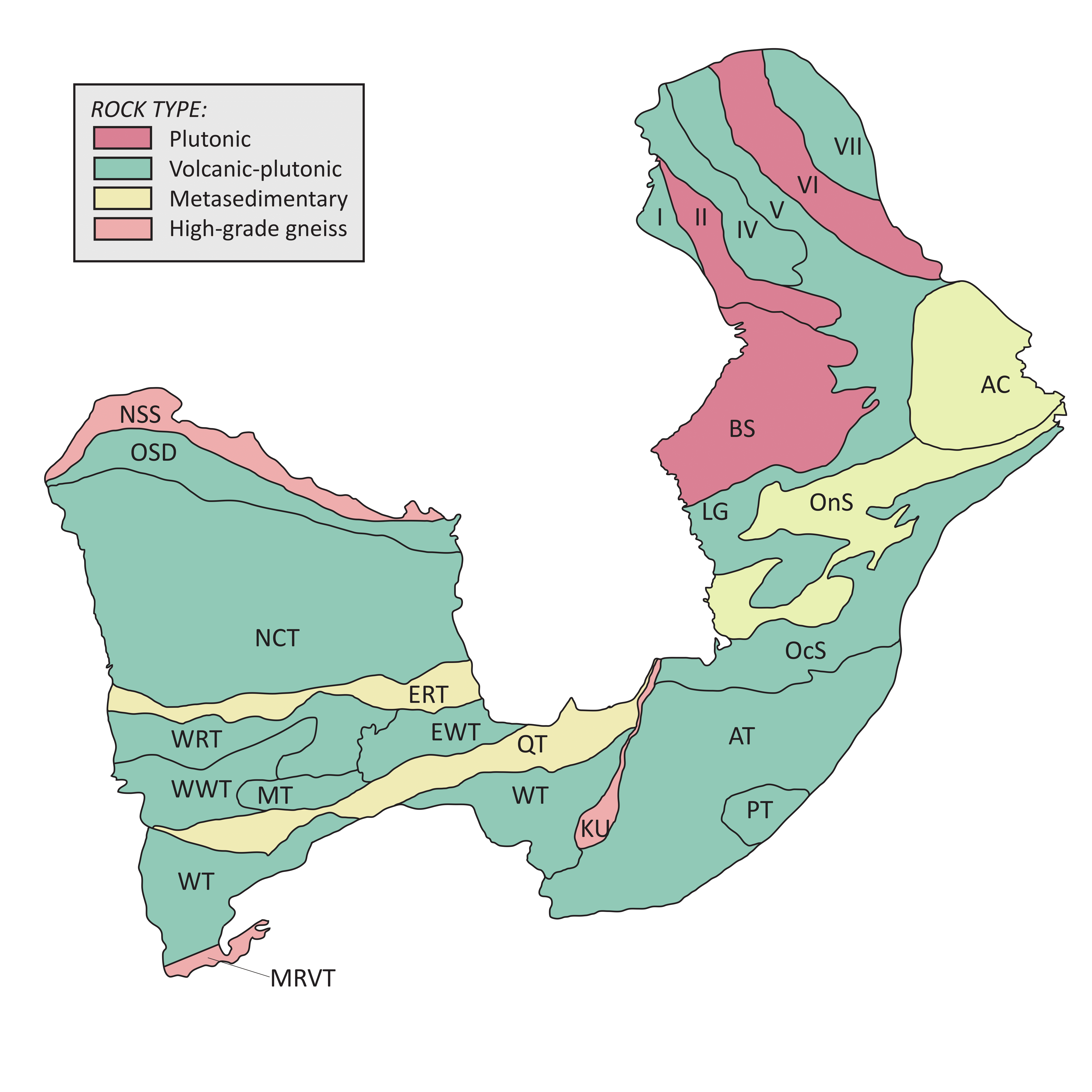
This map shows the major domains of the Superior Craton. NSS: Northern Superior Superterrane; OSD Oxford-Stull Terrane; NCT: North Caribou Terrane; ERT: English River Domain; WRT: Winnipeg River Domain; WWT: Western Wabigoon Terrane; EWT: Eastern Wabigoon Terrane; MT: Marmion Terrane; QT: Quetico Terrane; WT: Wawa Terrane; MRVT: Minnesota River Valley Terrane; KU: Kapuskasing Uplift; AT: Abitibi Terrane; PT: Pontiac Terrane; OcS: Opatica Subprovince; AC: Ashuanipi Complex; OnS: Opinaca Subprovince; LG: La Grande Subprovince; BS: Bienville Subprovince; I: Inukjuak Domain; II Tikkerutuk Domain; IV: Lake Minto Domain; V: Goudalie Domain: VI Utsalik Domain; VII: Douglas Harbour Domain

The Superior Province can be divided into three parts. The first part is the northwestern region characterized by high-grade gneiss, such as Minto and Pikwitonei. The second part is the northeastern region, which is characterized by pervasive metamorphic rocks of granulite-facies. The last part is the southern region like the Minnesota River Valley, which are metavolcanic or metasedimentary subprovinces with an east–west orientation.

The general geological characteristics of the terranes are listed below.

==== List of subprovinces and their dominating rocks ====
Subprovince	Age	Dominating rock	Possible tectonic event	Mineral deposit
Western Superior Province
Northern Superior Superterrane (NSS)		Granitic and gneissic rocks; Mafic-intermediate volcanic rocks; Minor greywacke	Granitoid magmatism; Amphibolite-forming metamorphism caused by tectonic accretion	Lode gold deposits; Diamond-containing kimberlite pipes
Oxford-Skull Domain (OSD)		Basalt (Hayers River Assemblage); Volcaniclastic rocks (Oxford Lake assemblage); Underlain by tonalitic, granodioritic, granitic pluton with mafic intrusion	Oceanic setting; Sealed the sediment after the collision of NSS and NCS	Lode gold deposits (like Monument Bay gold deposit)
North Caribou Superterrane (NCS)		Plutonic base overlain by arc sequences; Pervasive granitic to tonalitic pluton in the central region	Dominating plutonism; Rifting in the southern margin	Gold deposits (like Red Lake Gold Camp); Massive sulphide deposits
English River Domain (ERT)		Sedimentary rocks like wackes; Amphibolite and low-pressure granulite; Migmatite and diatexite	Related to the suture of the NCS and WRT	/
Winnipeg River Terrane (WRT)		Gneiss and foliated tonalite; Granite	Tonalitic plutonism followed by granitic plutonism	Iron deposits; Native silver deposits
Wabigoon Terrane (WwT/EwT)		Mafic volcanic rocks and tonalitic pluton in the West; Greenstone belts intruded by granitoid pluton in the East	Oceanic arc setting in the West; Continental margin setting in the East	/
Quetico Terrane (QT)		Mainly greywacke, migmatite, granite; Metarsedimentary successions intruded by tonalite, nepheline, syenite, carbonatite and granite	Ancient forearc	/
Wawa Terrane (WT)		Calc-alkalic to alkalic rocks; Sanukitoids	Oceanic tectonic mélange	Michipicoten-Mishubishu belt (Fe, Au, Cu and minor Ni); Shebandowan-Schreiber belt (Fe, Au, VMS, Ni)
Kapuskasing Uplift (KU)		Tonalite, paragneiss and anorthosite	Intracratonic Uplift	/
Eastern Superior Province
Abitibi Terrane (AT)		North: Layered-intrusion-related volcanic rocks; Central: Plutonic rocks and minor volcanic rocks - South: Younger greywackes, conglomerate and alkaline volcanic rocks	/	North: Massive sulphide deposits, Cu-Zn vein deposits, lode gold deposits; Central: Massive sulphide deposits and vein gold deposits - South: Gold deposits, Cu-Zn massive sulphide deposits, intrusive Ni deposits, and minor porphyry deposits
Pontiac Terrane (PT)		North: schists and paragneiss; South: volcanic rocks	Fold-thrust belt	Quartz-vein-hosted gold deposits; Gabbroic-sill-hosted Ni-Cu sulphide deposits
Opatica Subprovince (OcS)		Tonalite, granodiorite, granite and pegmatite	West-verging shearing followed by south-vergent movement	Volcanogenic massive sulphide (VMS) deposits, Cu-Au vein deposits, Intrusion-hosted Ni-Cu deposits and iron formation
Opinaca Subprovince (OnS)		metagreywacke; massive leucogranite intrusion	/	Rare metals in peraluminous granites and pegmatites
Ashuanipi Complex (AC)		Tonalite and diorite; Granulite - Intrusion of diatexite, syenite, granodiorite and granite	/	/
La Grande Subprovince (LG)		Gneissic basement; komatiites	/	Porphyry and igneous mineralization
Bienville Subprovince (BS)		North: granitic and granodioritic intrusions; South: massive granodioritic complex	/	/
Northeastern Superior Province(NESP)		I: tonalite and tonalitic gneiss; II: pyroxene-bearing plutonic rocks - IV: metasedimentary and pyroxene-bearing pluton - V: pyroxene-bearing pluton with minor tonalite - VI: magnetic pyroxene-bearing pluton - VII: tonalitic complex	/	Syngenetic: Algoma-type iron formation, volcanogenic massive sulphide, Ni-Cu deposits, Fe-Ti-V deposits (hosted by mafic intrusions), and U-Th-Mo bearing porphyry deposits; Epigenetic: Cu, Ni, Ag, Au, rare earth elements (REE) and limited U deposits

== Development ==
Research of the Superior Craton in the past focused on how the western part formed. This leaves uncertainties in the linkage between the west and the east.

=== Western Superior Craton ===
The western Superior Craton is formed by different terranes stitching with each other continuously during the Neoarchean period. Such a progressive assembly can be explained by five discrete orogenies (mountain-building processes). They are, from the oldest event to the youngest event, the Northern Superior Orogeny, the Uchian Orogeny, the Central Superior Orogeny, the Shebandowanian Orogeny and the Minnesotan Orogeny. These events show that the timeline of accretions starts from the north with a southward assembling direction.

For these accretions, the North Caribou Terrane acted as the accretion nuclei onto which other terranes dock on its northern and southern side.

==== Northern Superior Orogeny (2720 Ma) ====
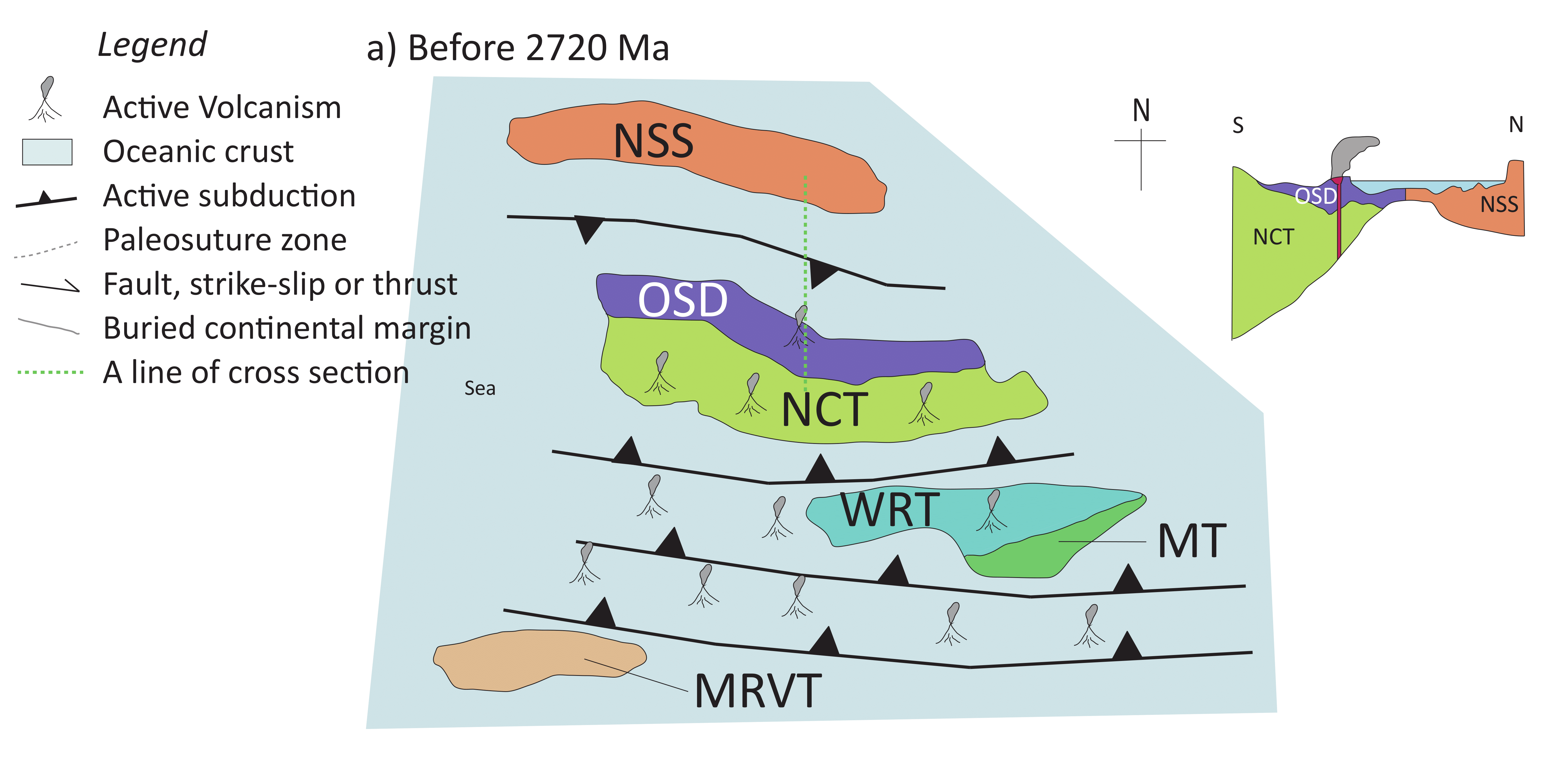
Before 2720 Ma, there were many pieces of microcontinent fragments which E-W trending conduit-like ocean crusts (with unknown extent) separates them.

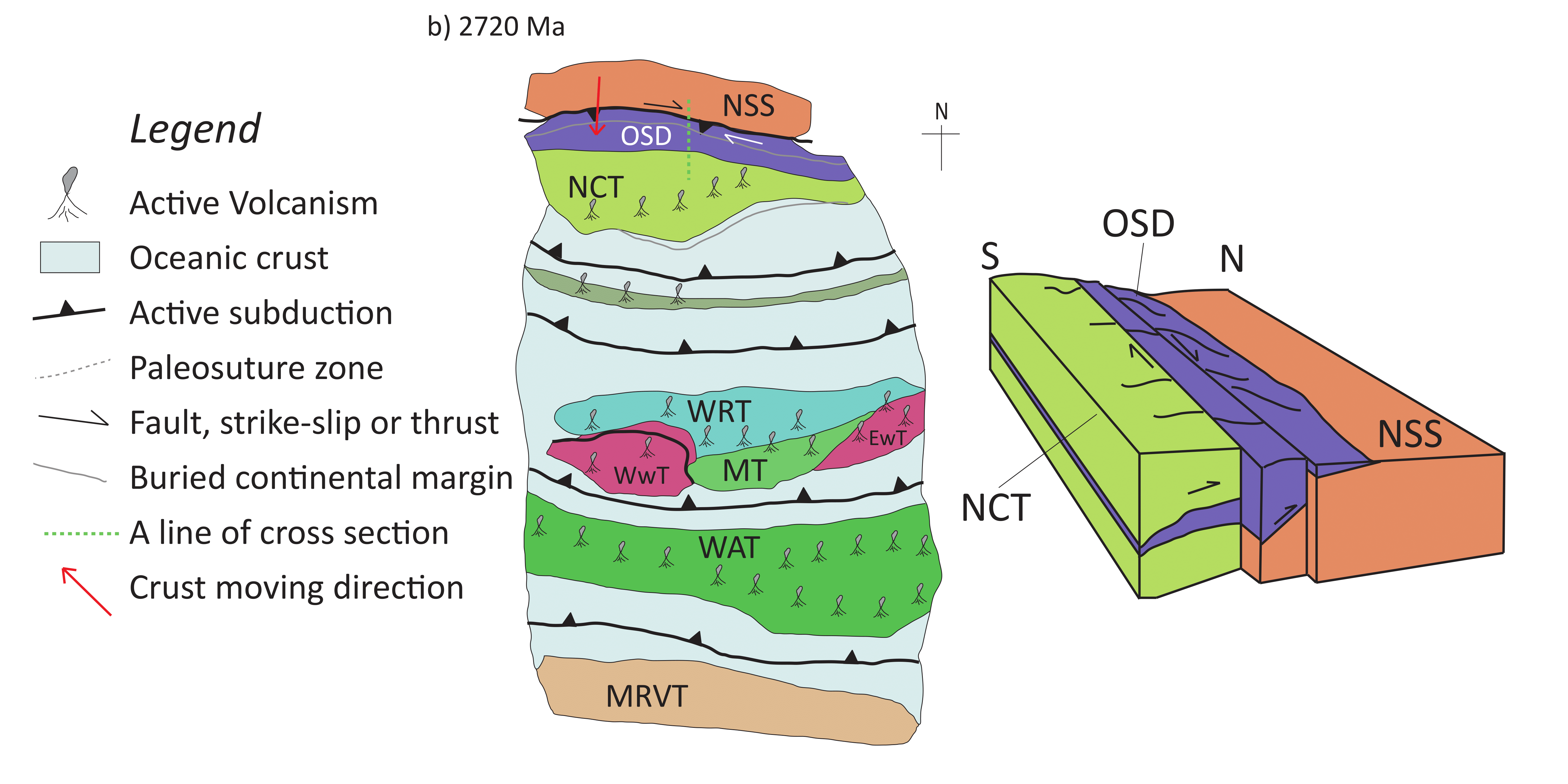
Northern Superior Superterrane moves southward to dock onto the North Caribou Terrane.

Before 2720 Ma, there were many pieces of microcontinent fragments which E-W trending conduit-like ocean crusts (with unknown extent) separates them. During 2720 Ma, active subduction along the Northern Superior Superterrane and the North Caribou Terrane caused the southward drifting of the Northern Superior Superterrane. Over time, it united the North Caribou Superterrane and confined the Oxford-Stull domain, which contains rock assemblages related to the continental margin and oceanic crust. The combination of the Northern Superior Superterrane and the North Caribou Superterrane by subduction marked the initiation of the Superior Craton formation. The southward movement of the Northern Superior Superterrane to the North Caribou Superterrane driven by subduction activity is evident by a) arc-related magmatism in Oxford-Stull domain during 2775-2733 Ma; b) the south-over-north shearing zone at the contact between the two terranes. The suture zone of the subduction is inferred to be the margin of the North Kenyon Fault. The docking of the Northern Superior Superterrane is evident by the >3.5 Ga detrital zircons found in synorogenic (meaning that it forms during an orogenic event) sedimentary rocks aged <2.711 Ga. The docking also initiated the eruption of shoshonitic volcanic rocks during 2710 Ma and the regional shortening. The regional shortening had undergone folding and foliation to form right-lateral, NW-trending shear zones.

==== Uchian Orogeny (2720–2700 Ma) ====
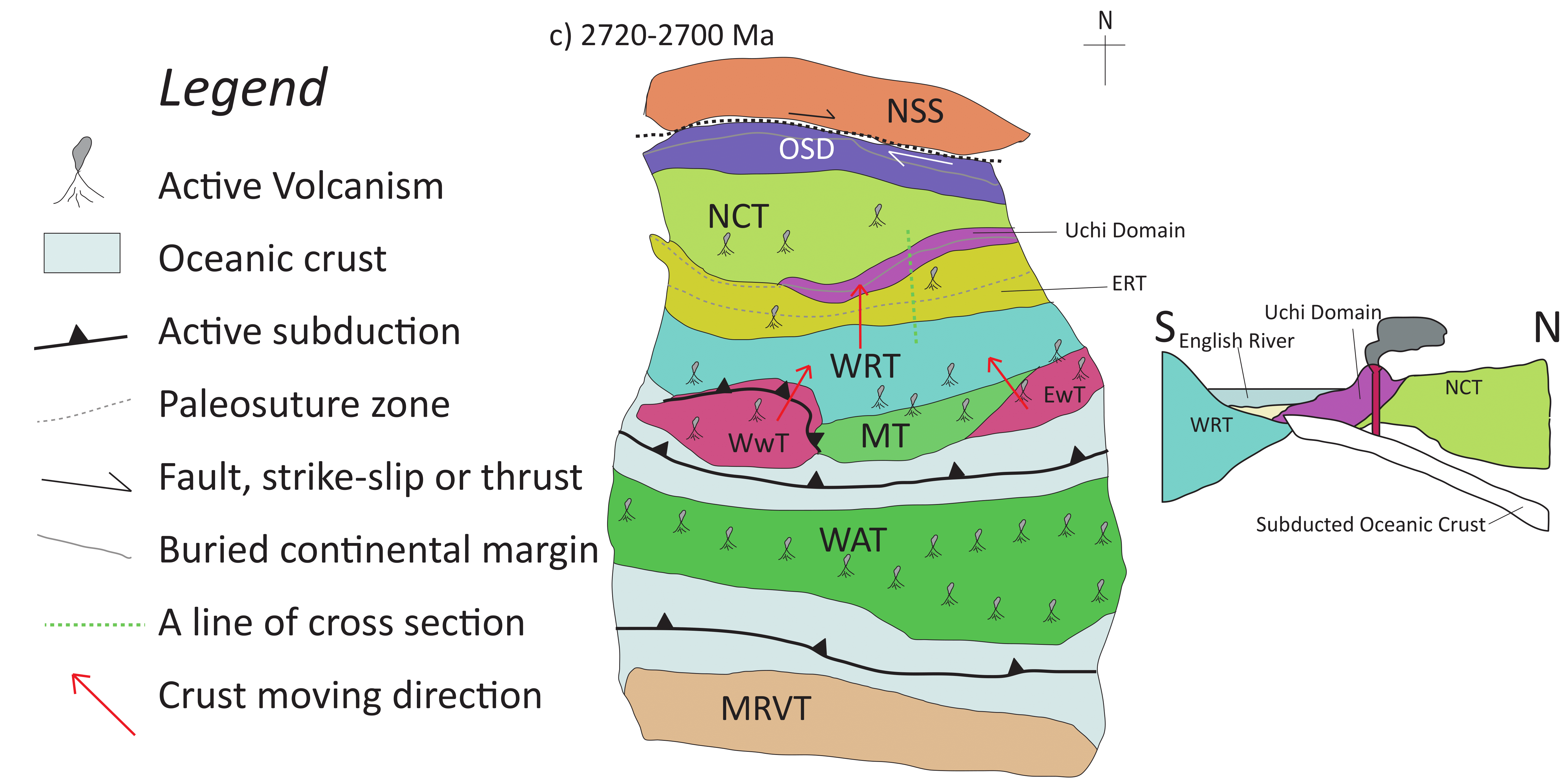
During this period, the Winnipeg River Terrane at the south docked northward onto the North Caribou Terrane. The two terranes then sutured to form the English River belt, which was no earlier than <2705 Ma. Also, it marks the accretion of the younger Western Wabigoon terrane to the southwestern margin of the Winnipeg River Terrane.

During this period, the Winnipeg River Terrane at the south docked northward onto the North Caribou Terrane. The two terranes then sutured to form the English River belt, which was no earlier than <2705 Ma.

During the orogeny, at the south-central North Caribou Superterrane, rocks were deformed thoroughly (from 2718 to 2712 Ma). After the deformation, plutons were emplaced in the area after the tectonic movements and cooled by about 2700 Ma. Following the cooling of the pluton was the swift burial and melting of the rocks in the English River belt and Winnipeg River Terrane, as well as the overthrusting of the North Caribou Superterrane onto the English River Basin in a southward direction. Arc-related magmatic activities sustained in other areas of the southern North Caribou Superterrane margin at <2710 Ma. What was following is the deformation penetrative in both eastern (occurred at 2714-2702 Ma) and western (occurred at <2704 Ma) margins, followed by ductile-brittle faults.

==== Central Superior Orogeny (2700 Ma) ====
The Central Orogeny is significant as it involves the accretion of the younger Western Wabigoon terrane to the southwestern margin of the Winnipeg River Terrane.

Two types of models were proposed to illustrate the process accretion with distinctive subduction polarity: Sanborn-Barrie and Skulski (2006) suggested that the accretion was achieved by the northeastward subduction of the Western Wabigoon Terrane underneath the Winnipeg River Terrane. This model is supported by evidence like the formation of the tonalitic and pyroclastic rocks in 2715-2700Ma and the deformation style of the Warclub turbidite assemblage which infers the over-riding of Winnipeg River Terrane on Western Wabigoon Terrane.

Another type of Models was suggested by Davis and Smith (1991), Percival et al. (2004a) and Melnyk et al. (2006), which suggested an opposite direction of subduction (Southwestward). These models are supported by the ductile rock textures in the lower plate of the Winnipeg River Terrane and the open folds in the Western Wabigoon Terrane, implying the overriding role of Western Wabigoon Terrane instead of Winnipeg River Terrane shown in the previous model.

==== Shebandowanian Orogeny (2690 Ma) ====
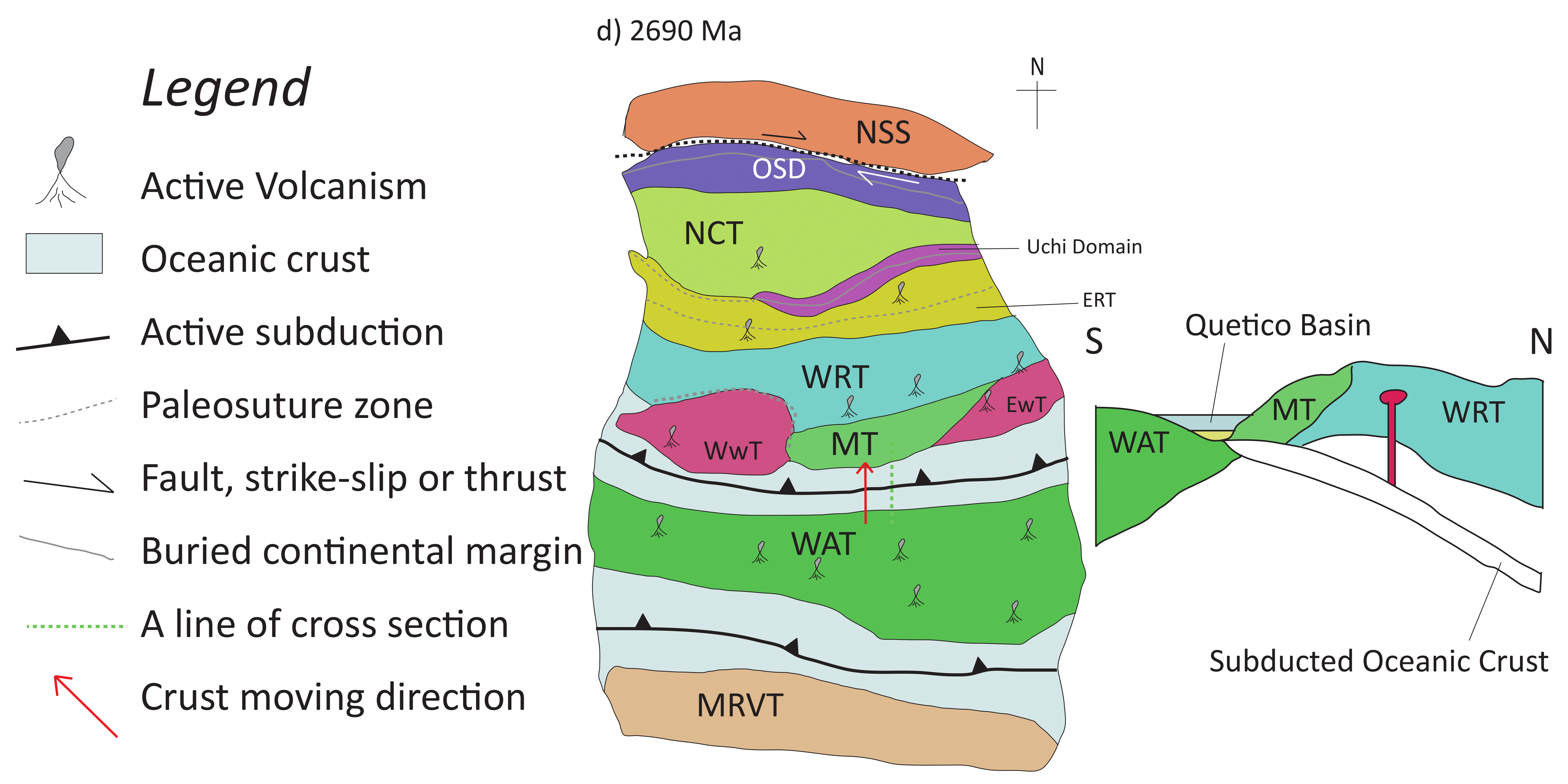
The Wawa-Abitibi terrane moved northward to collide with the growing craton.

Shebandowanian orogeny marks the accretion of the Wawa-Abitibi terrane to the composite Superior superterrane at the southern margin of the Wabigoon terranes.

The northward direction of the subduction is evident due to the ceased arc magmatism in Winnipeg River superterrane at about 2695 Ma. Apart from the ceased magmatism, the sanukitoid plutons formed in the area during 2695-2685 Ma (which inferred the breakoff of a subduction slab) also indicated the subduction towards the north. After the subduction, the two terranes were sutured under the Quetico belt. This also trapped the clastic sediments fluxing into the belt, marking its transition from an accretionary wedge to a foreland basin. At the northern Wawa-Abitibi terrane, researchers identified two events of deformation occurred during the orogeny. The first one (D_{1} deformation event) is the intra-arc deformation accompanied by calc-alkaline magmatism during 2695 Ma. The second one (D_{2} deformation event) is the transpressive deformation at the margin between the Wawa-Abitibi Terrane and the Wabigoon terranes during 2685-2680 Ma.

==== Minnesotan Orogeny (2680 Ma) ====
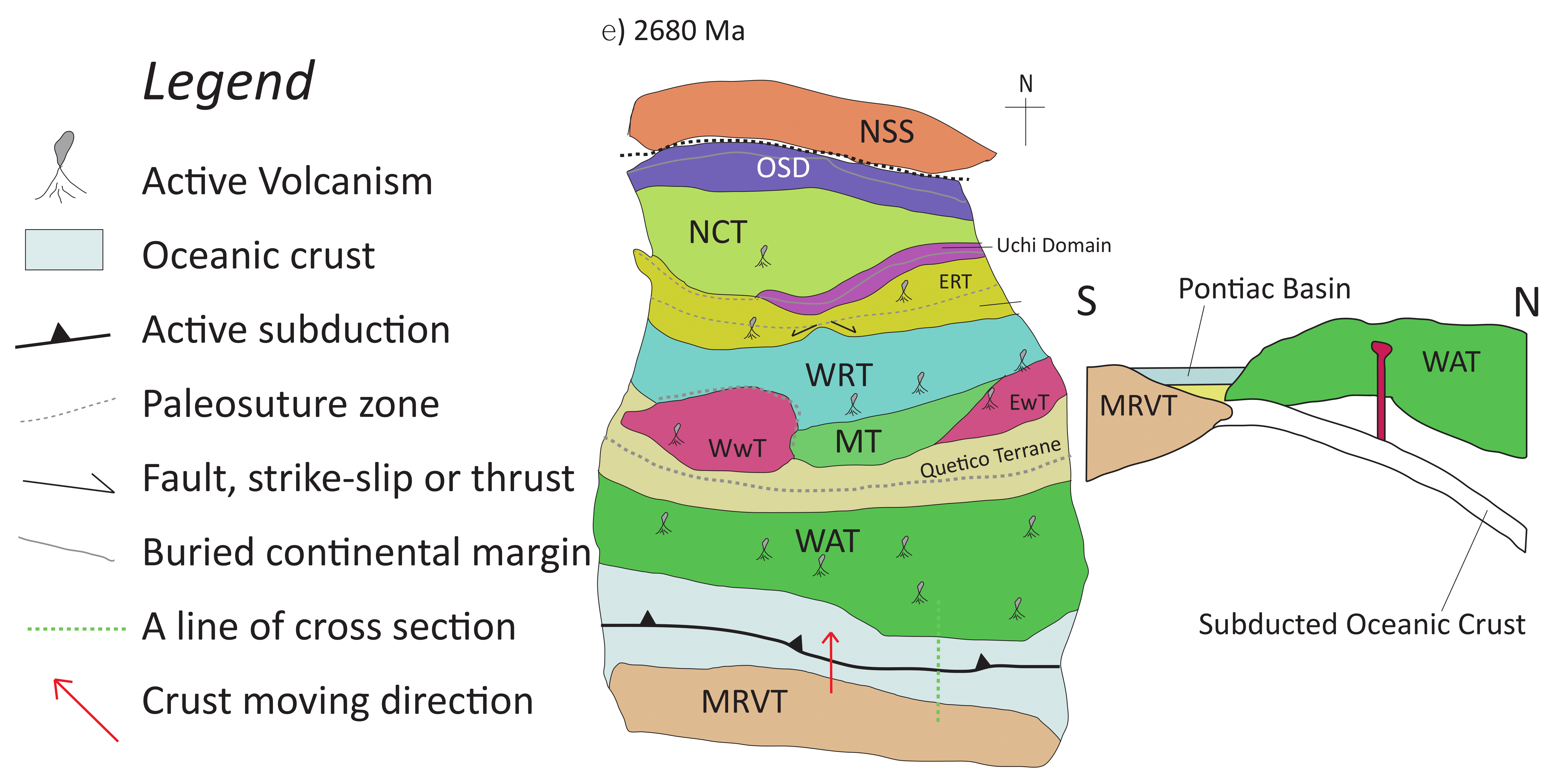
Minnesotan River Valley Terrane moved northward to collide with the pre-mature craton.

As the last significant accretion event, The Minnesotan Orogeny is associated with the accretion of the oceanic Minnesota River Valley Terrane and the composite Superior Craton. Subduction between the two terranes drove the Minnesota River Valley Terrane northward to meet the gigantic craton, which the two terranes sutured along the Great Lake tectonic zone.

The northward direction of the subduction is proven by the peraluminous granitoid magmatism in the southern margin of the Abitibi terrane, as well as the isotopic signature of the ancient crust underneath it.

The Minnesotan orogeny accounts for most of the deformation events in the Wawa-Abitibi Terrane and Minnesota River Valley Terrane. Research in the past regarded the Minnesota River Valley Terrane as a stiff crust with higher resistance relative to the weaker zones between the Minnesota River Valley Terrane and the Wawa-Abitibi Terrane, like a rigid "jaw" juxtaposing a weak zone in the "vice" models suggested by Ellis et al. (1998). However, the study of seismic reflection images by Percival et al. reveals that Minnesota River Valley Terrane positions at the bottom of a thrust sequence, providing evidence that it is an oceanic slab.

==== Summary of the Western Superior Craton development ====
Time	Event	Description
2720 Ma	Northern Superior Orogeny	Northern Superior Superterrane moves southward to dock onto the North Caribou Terrane.
2700 Ma	Uchian Orogeny	Winnipeg River Terrane docked northward onto the North Caribou Terrane.
2720-2700 Ma	Central Superior Orogeny	Sanborn-Barrie and Skulski (2006): Western Wabigoon Terrane docked northeastward to the Winnipeg River Terrane. Davis and Smith (1991), Percival et al. (2004a) and Melnyk et al. (2006): The young craton moved southwestward to fuse with the Western Wabigoon Terrane.
2690 Ma	Shebandowanian Orogeny	The Wawa-Abitibi terrane moved northward to collide with the growing craton.
2680 Ma	Minnesotan Orogeny	Minnesotan River Valley Terrane moved northward to collide with the pre-mature craton.

=== Orogenesis in the northeastern Superior Craton ===
The correlations of different building processes of the NE Superior Craton remains sophisticated. Still, there are two general understandings to unveil the relationships among the overlapping magmatic and metamorphic events.

The first one is suggested by Percival and Skulski (2000). It is a collisional model which at 2700 Ma, the Rivière terrane from the east collided with the Hudson Bay terrane located at the west side. This collision leads to the high-grade metamorphism followed by a regional folding event. Apart from this, the model relates the collision with the Uchian orogeny concurrently happening at the south and the west.

The second one is suggested by Bédard (2003) and Bédard et al. (2003). This model puts emphasis on the role of magmatic diapirism in the linear structure and metamorphism of the NE superior craton, implying an active anorogenic magmatism during the accretion of the southern Superior Craton.

== See also ==
- Canadian Shield
- Circum-Superior Belt
- Craton
- Geology of Ontario
- Greenstone belt
- List of shields and cratons
- Terrane
