= Hans Stille =

German ocean geologist known for alternative mechanisms of plate tectonics

Hans (Wilhelm) Stille
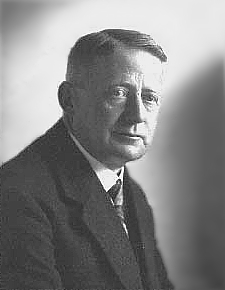
- 1941
- Born: 8 October 1876; Hanover, Germany
- Died: 26 December 1966 (aged 90); Hanover, Germany
- Known for: Craton; Geosyncline theory
- Awards: Gustav-Steinmann-Medaille (1951)
- Scientific career
- Fields: Geology (Tectonics)
- Institutions: University of Göttingen; Humboldt University of Berlin
- Academic advisors: Adolf von Koenen

Hans Wilhelm Stille (8 October 1876 – 26 December 1966) was an influential German geologist working primarily on tectonics and the collation of tectonic events during the Phanerozoic. Stille adhered to the contracting Earth hypothesis and together with Leopold Kober he worked on the geosyncline theory to explain orogeny. Stille's ideas emerged in the aftermath of Eduard Suess' book Das Antlitz der Erde (1883–1909). Stille's and Kober's school of thought was one of two that emerged in the post-Suess era (the other being headed by Alfred Wegener and Émile Argand.) Their competing view rejected Earth contraction and argued for continental drift. As Stille opposed continental drift he came to be labelled a "fixist".

Part of Stille's work dealt with massifs and sedimentary basins in Central Europe; differing from Suess' interpretations for the same area showing that between the Bohemian and Rhine massifs Mesozoic rocks were folded.

A central tenet in Stille's geology was that geosynclines became depressions without any faulting with any fault found being the product of later processes like the final collapse of the geosyncline.

In 1933 Stille would shorten Leopold Kober's concept of kratogen, that was used to describe those portions of the continental crust that were old and stable, into kraton (English: craton). The Geotectonic Research journal was founded in 1937 by Hans Stille and Franz Lotze.

The enormous influence that Stille's concepts had on tectonics is obvious from many of the tectonic terms still in use today, despite the fact that almost everything he postulated was later shown to be completely erroneous.

— Celâl Şengör, 1982

== Awards and honours ==
The Hans-Stille-Medaille of German Geological Society, awarded annually, is named after him. Also named for him is the mineral stilleite (ZnSe) and the wrinkle ridge Dorsa Stille on the Moon.

== Bibliography ==
- Barbara Sperling. "Stille, Hans (Johannes) Wilhelm Tektoniker, Geologe, * 8. 10. 1876 Hannover, † 26. 12. 1966 Hannover" (in German). Deutsche Biographie.
- Şengör, Celâl (1982). "Classical theories of orogenesis". In Miyashiro, Akiho; Aki, Keiiti; Şengör, Celâl (eds.). Orogeny. John Wiley & Sons. ISBN 0-471-103764.
- Malakhova, Irena G. (1 May 2018). "The Russian trace of Hans Stille (1876–1966)". Global Tectonics and Metallogeny. 10 (2–4). Schweizerbart: 67–76. doi:10.1127/gtm/2018/0016. ISSN 0163-3171.
