= Geosyncline =

Obsolete geological concept to explain orogens

Development of a mountain range by sedimentation of a geosyncline and isostatic uplifting. This is the "collapse" of the geosyncline.

A geosyncline (originally called a geosynclinal) is an obsolete geological concept to explain orogens, which was developed in the late 19th and early 20th centuries, before the theory of plate tectonics was envisaged. A geosyncline was described as a giant downward fold in the Earth's crust, with associated upward folds called geanticlines (or geanticlinals), that preceded the climax phase of orogenic deformation.

== History ==
The geosyncline concept was first conceived by the American geologists James Hall and James Dwight Dana in the mid-19th century, during the classic studies of the Appalachian Mountains. Émile Haug further developed the geosyncline concept, and introduced it to Europe in 1900. Eduard Suess, a leading geologist of his time, disapproved the concept of geosyncline, and in 1909 he argued against its use due to its association with outdated theories. This did not prevent further development of the concept in the first half of the 20th century by Leopold Kober and Hans Stille, both of whom worked on a contracting Earth framework.

The continued development of the geosyncline theory by Stille and Kober following the publication of Eduard Suess' Das Antlitz der Erde from 1885 to 1909 was not unchallenged, as another school of thought was led by Alfred Wegener and Émile Argand. This competing view rejected the premise of planetary contraction, and argued that orogeny was the result of continental drift. These two views can be called "fixist", in the case of geosyncline theory, and "mobilist" for the support of continental drift.

Even as continental drift became generally accepted, the concept of geosynclines persisted in geological science. In 1970, John F. Dewey and John M. Bird adapted the geosyncline to plate tectonics. The term continued to have usage within a plate tectonics framework in the 1980s, although as early as 1982, Celâl Şengör argued against its use, in light of its association with discredited geological ideas.

== Geosynclinal theory ==
Dana and Stille supposed that the collapse of geosynclines into orogens was result of the Earth's contraction over time. In Stille and Kober's view, geosynclines and orogens were the unstable parts of the Earth's crust, in stark contrast with the very stable kratogens. Stille theorized that the contractional forces responsible for geosynclines also formed epeirogenic uplifts, resulting in a pattern of undulation in the Earth's crust. According to this view, regular, episodic global revolutions caused geosynclines to collapse, forming orogens. According to Kober and Stille, developing geosynclinal depressions were accompanied by uplifted geanticlines, which then eroded, providing sediments that filled the geosynclinal basin. According to Stille, geosynclines were formed from crustal folding rather than faulting; if faults were present in geosynclines, they were the product of later processes, such as the final collapse of the geosyncline.

Gustav Steinmann interpreted ophiolites using the geosyncline concept. He theorized that the apparent lack of ophiolite in the Peruvian Andes was indebted either to the Andes being preceded by a shallow geosyncline, or because the Andes represented just the margin of a geosyncline. Steinmann contributed this correlation to the distinction between Cordilleran and Alpine-type mountains. According to Stille, a type of geosyncline called a "eugeosyncline" was characterized by producing an "initial magmatism", which in some cases corresponded to ophiolitic magmatism.

With respect to oceanic basins, Kober held them to be separate and distinct from geosynclines. He nonetheless believed that mid-ocean ridges were orogens, although Stille disagreed, asserting that they were places of extensional tectonics, as exemplified by Iceland. Meanwhile, Argand argued that geosynclines, sufficiently attenuated through stretching, could become oceans basins, as a material called "sima" surfaced.

Hans Stille's classification
Geosyncline type	Geosyncline subtype	Associated magmatism	Resulting mountain type
Orthogeosyncline	Eugeosyncline	Initial magmatism	Alpinotype
Orthogeosyncline	Miogeosyncline	-	Alpinotype
Parageosyncline		-	Germanotype

== See also ==
- Syncline – Structural geology term for a fold with younger layers closer to the center of the structure
- Anticline – In geology, an anticline is a type of fold that is an arch-like shape
- Isostasy – State of gravitational equilibrium between Earth's crust and mantle

== Bibliography ==
- King, Philip B. (1977) The Evolution of North America, Revised edition, Princeton University Press, pp 54–58
- Kay, Marshall (1951) North American Geosyncline: Geol. Soc. America Mem. 48, 143pp.
- Şengör, Celâl (1982). "Classical theories of orogenesis". In Miyashiro, Akiho; Aki, Keiiti; Şengör, Celâl (eds.). Orogeny. John Wiley & Sons. ISBN 0-471-103764.
