= Tectonic uplift =

Geologic uplift of Earth's surface that is attributed to plate tectonics

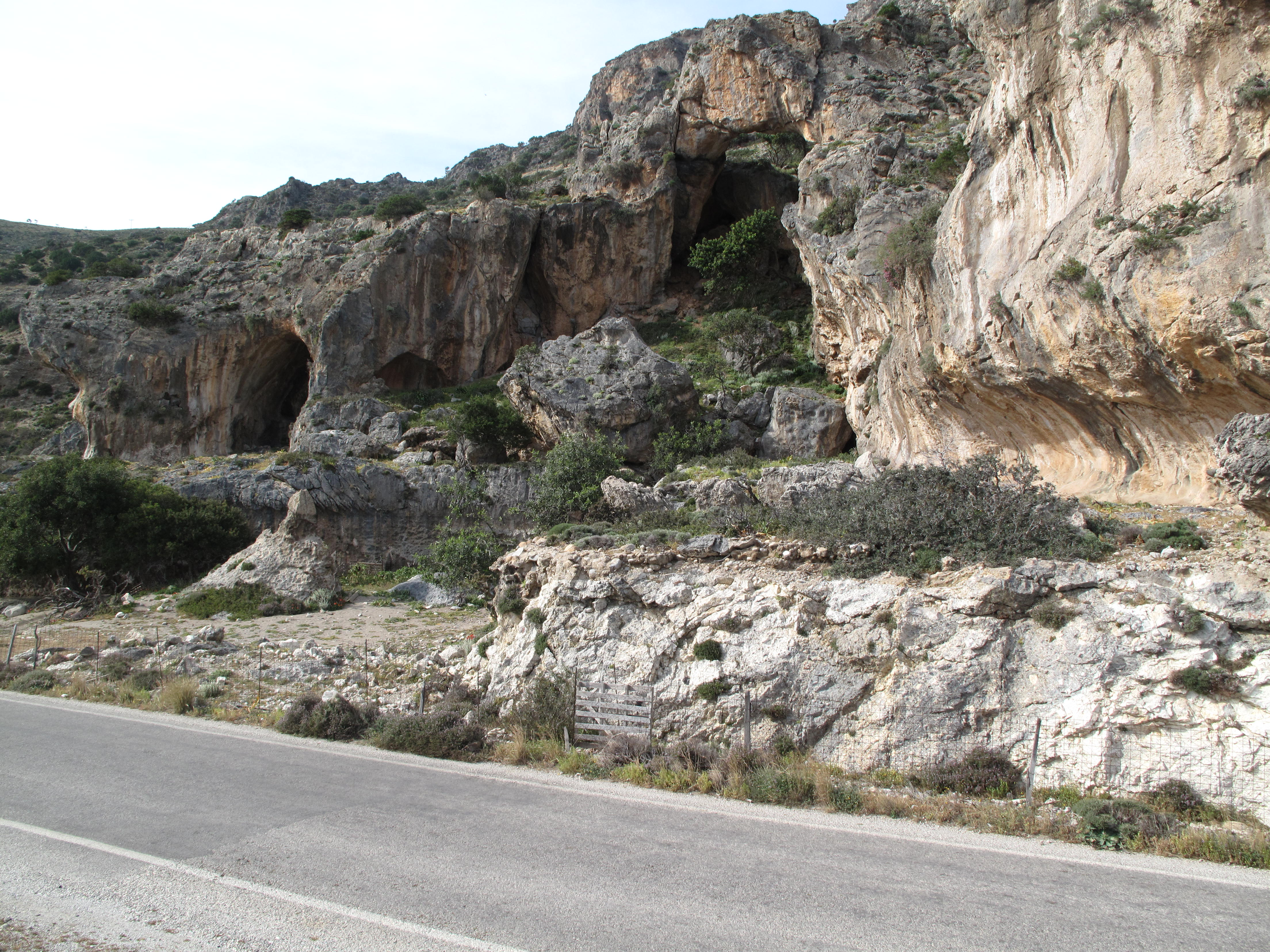
Raised beach indicating 9 m of uplift during the 365 Crete earthquake, other shorelines identified at this site are at 14 m, 17m, 34m, 55m & 75m elevation, consistent with a long-term uplift rate of 2.5–2.7 mm per year over the last 45,000 years

Tectonic uplift is the geologic uplift of Earth's surface that is attributed to plate tectonics. While isostatic response is important, an increase in the mean elevation of a region can only occur in response to tectonic processes of crustal thickening (such as mountain building events), changes in the density distribution of the crust and underlying mantle, and flexural support due to the bending of rigid lithosphere.

Tectonic uplift results in denudation (processes that wear away the earth's surface) by raising buried rocks closer to the surface. This process can redistribute large loads from an elevated region to a topographically lower area as well – thus promoting an isostatic response in the region of denudation (which can cause local bedrock uplift). The timing, magnitude, and rate of denudation can be estimated by geologists using pressure-temperature studies.

== Crustal thickening ==
Crustal thickening has an upward component of motion and often occurs when continental crust is thrust onto continental crust. Basically nappes (thrust sheets) from each plate collide and begin to stack one on top of the other; evidence of this process can be seen in preserved ophiolitic nappes (preserved in the Himalayas) and in rocks with an inverted metamorphic gradient. The preserved inverted metamorphic gradient indicates that nappes were actually stacked on top of each other so quickly that hot rocks did not have time to equilibrate before being thrust on top of cool rocks. The process of nappe stacking can only continue for so long, as gravity will eventually disallow further vertical growth (there is an upper limit to vertical mountain growth).

== Density distribution of the crust and underlying mantle ==
Although the raised surfaces of mountain ranges mainly result from crustal thickening, there are other forces at play that are responsible for the tectonic activity. All tectonic processes are driven by gravitational force when density differences are present. A good example of this would be the large-scale circulation of the Earth's mantle. Lateral density variations near the surface (such as the creation, cooling, and subduction of oceanic plates) also drive plate motion.

The dynamics of mountain ranges are governed by differences in the gravitational energy of entire columns of the lithosphere (see isostasy). If a change in surface height represents an isostatically compensated change in crustal thickness, the rate of change of potential energy per unit surface area is proportional to the rate of increase of average surface height. The highest rates of working against gravity are required when the thickness of the crust (not the lithosphere) changes.

== Lithospheric flexure ==
Lithospheric flexure is the process by which the lithosphere bends under the action of forces such as the weight of a growing orogeny or changes in ice thickness related to glaciation. The lithosphere rests on the asthenosphere, a viscous layer that in geological time scales behaves like a fluid. Thus, when loaded, the lithosphere progressively reaches an isostatic equilibrium. For example, the lithosphere on the oceanward side of an oceanic trench at a subduction zone will curve upwards due to the elastic properties of the Earth's crust.

== Orogenic uplift ==
Orogenic uplift is the result of tectonic-plate collisions and results in mountain ranges or a more modest uplift over a large region. Perhaps the most extreme form of orogenic uplift is a continental-continental crustal collision. In this process, two continents are sutured together, and large mountain ranges are produced. The collision of the Indian and Eurasian plates is a good example of the extent to which orogenic uplift can reach. Heavy thrust faulting (of the Indian plate beneath the Eurasian plate) and folding are responsible for the suturing together of the two plates. The collision of the Indian and Eurasian plates produced the Himalayas and is also responsible for crustal thickening north into Siberia. The Pamir Mountains, Tian Shan, Altai, Hindu Kush, and other mountain belts are all examples of mountain ranges formed in response to the collision of the Indian with the Eurasian plate.

The Ozark Plateau is a broad uplifted area which resulted from the Permian Ouachita Orogeny to the south in the states of Arkansas, Oklahoma, and Texas. Another related uplift is the Llano Uplift in Texas, a geographical location named after its uplift features. The Colorado Plateau which includes the Grand Canyon is the result of broad tectonic uplift followed by river erosion.

When mountains rise slowly, either due to orogenic uplift or other processes (e.g., rebound after glaciation), an unusual feature known as a water gap may occur. In these, erosion from a stream occurs faster than mountain uplift, resulting in a gorge or valley that runs through a mountain range from low-lying country on one side to similar country on the other. Examples of such water gaps include the Manawatū Gorge in New Zealand and the Cumberland Narrows in Maryland.

== Isostatic uplift ==
The removal of mass from a region will be isostatically compensated by crustal rebound. If we take into consideration typical crustal and mantle densities, erosion of an average 100 meters of rock across a broad, uniform surface will cause the crust to isostatically rebound about 85 meters and will cause only a 15-meter loss of mean surface elevation. An example of isostatic uplift is post-glacial rebound following the melting of ice sheets. The Hudson Bay region of Canada, the Great Lakes of Canada and the United States, and Fennoscandia are currently undergoing gradual rebound as a result of the melting of ice sheets 10,000 years ago.

Crustal thickening, which for example is currently occurring in the Himalayas due to the continental collision between the Indian and the Eurasian plates, can also lead to surface uplift; but due to the isostatic sinking of thickened crust, the magnitude of surface uplift will only be about one-sixth of the amount of crustal thickening. Therefore, in most convergent boundaries, isostatic uplift plays a relatively small role, and high peak formation can be more attributed to tectonic processes. Direct measures of the elevation change of the land surface can only be used to estimate erosion or bedrock uplift rates when other controls (such as changes in mean surface elevation, volume of eroded material, timescales and lags of isostatic response, variations in crustal density) are known.

== Coral islands ==
In a few cases, tectonic uplift can be seen in coral islands. This is evidenced by the presence of various oceanic islands composed entirely of coral, which otherwise appear to be volcanic islands. Examples of such islands are found in the Pacific, notably the three phosphate islets of Nauru, Makatea, and Banaba, as well as Maré and Lifou in New Caledonia; Fatu Huku in the Marquesas Islands; and Henderson Island in the Pitcairn Islands. The uplift of these islands is the result of the movement of oceanic tectonic plates. Sunken islands or guyots with their coral reefs are the result of crustal subsidence as the oceanic plate carries the islands to deeper or lower oceanic crust areas.

== Uplift vs. exhumation ==
The word "uplift" refers to displacement contrary to the direction of the gravity vector, and displacement is only defined when the object being displaced and the frame of reference is specified. Molnar and England identify three kinds of displacement to which the term "uplift" is applied:

1. Displacement of the Earth's surface with respect to the geoid. This is what we refer to as "surface uplift"; and surface uplift can be defined by averaging elevation and changes in elevation over surface areas of a specified size.
2. The "uplift of rocks" refers to the displacement of rocks with respect to the geoid.
3. The displacement of rocks with respect to the surface is called exhumation.

This simple equation relates the three kinds of displacement:

Surface uplift = uplift of rock – exhumation

The term geoid is used above to mean mean sea level and makes a good frame of reference. A given displacement within this frame of reference allows one to quantify the amount of work being done against gravity.

Measuring uplift and exhumation can be tricky. Measuring the uplift of a point requires measuring its elevation change – usually geoscientists are not trying to determine the uplift of a singular point but rather the uplift over a specified area. Accordingly, the change in elevation of all points on the surface of that area must be measured, and the rate of erosion must be zero or minimal. Also, sequences of rocks deposited during that uplift must be preserved. Needless to say, in mountain ranges where elevations are far above sea level these criteria are not easily met. Paleoclimatic restorations though can be valuable; these studies involve inferring changes in climate in an area of interest from changes with time of flora/fauna that is known to be sensitive to temperature and rainfall. The magnitude of the exhumation a rock has been subjected to may be inferred from geothermobarometry (measuring previous pressure and temperature history of a rock or assemblage). Knowing the pressure and temperature history of a region can yield an estimate of the ambient geothermal gradient and bounds on the exhumation process; however, geobarometric/geothermometric studies do not produce a rate of exhumation (or any other information on time). Exhumation rates can be inferred from fission tracks and from radiometric ages as long as a thermal profile can be estimated.

== Gallery ==
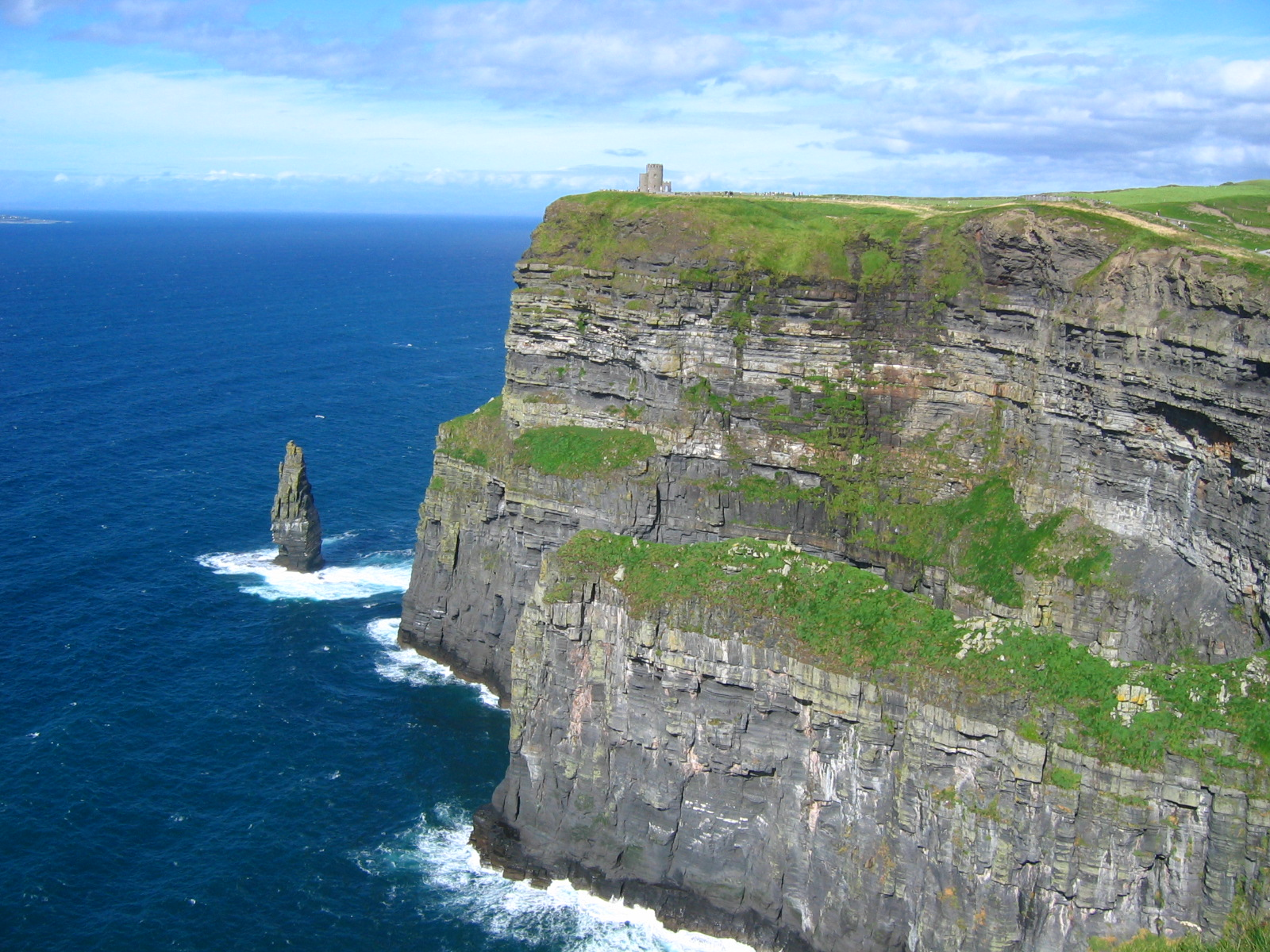
Cliffs of Moher

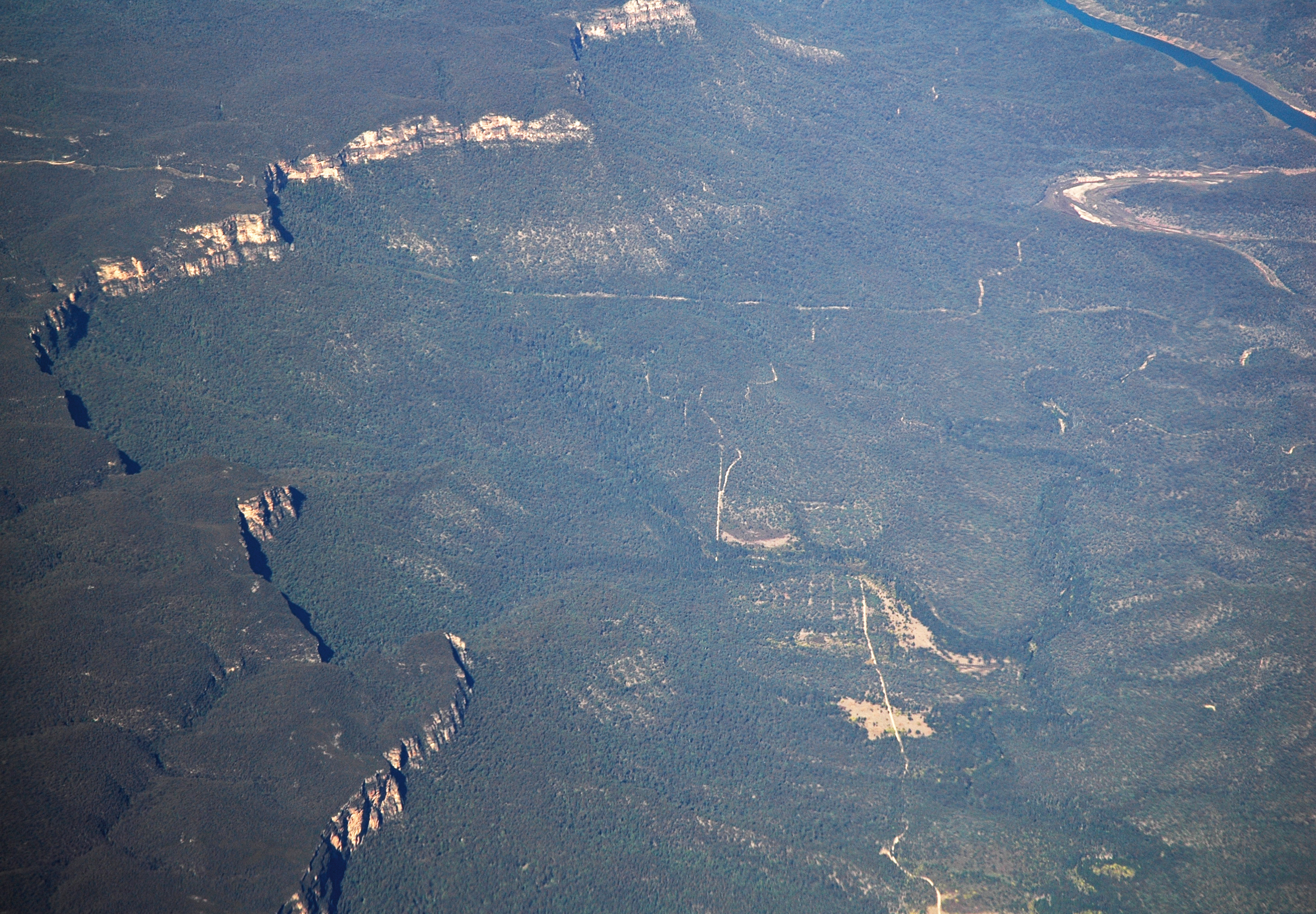
Tectonic uplifting in the Blue Mountains National Park

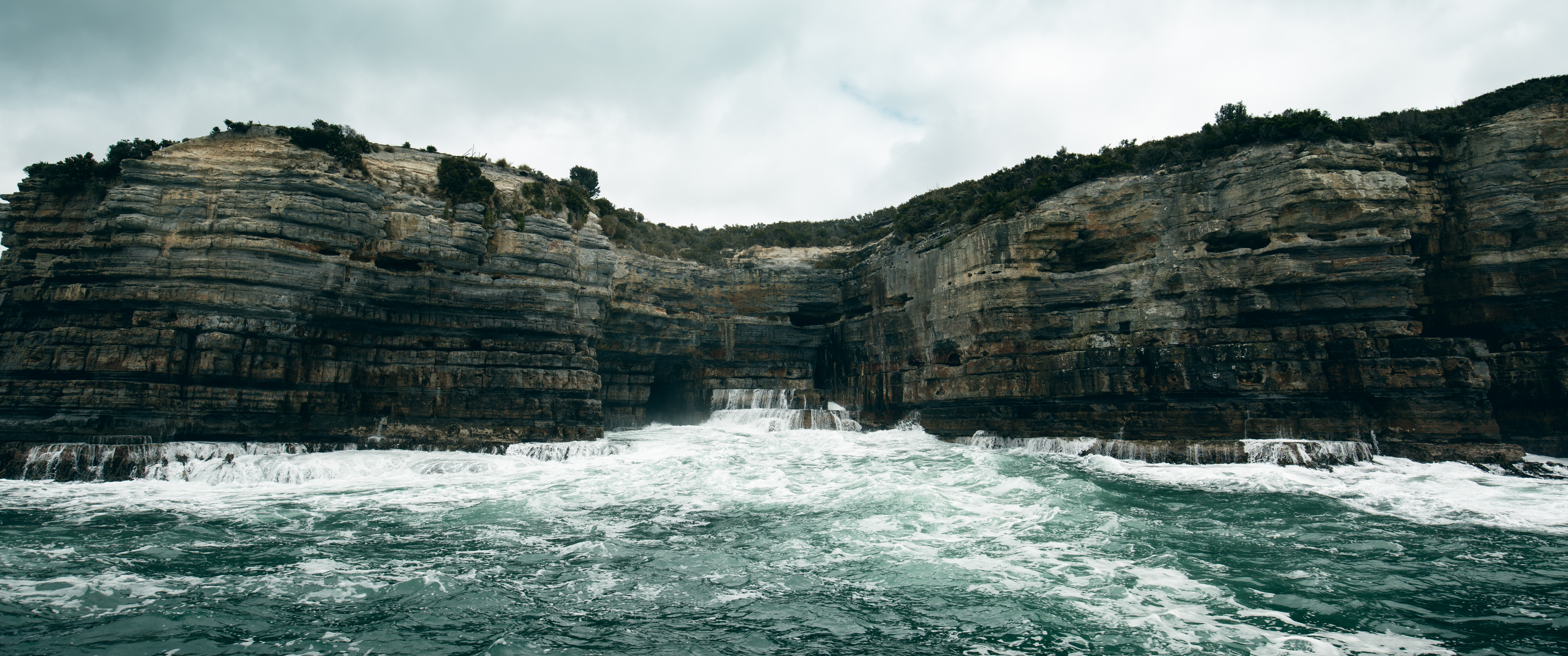
Cliffs of the Tasman National Park

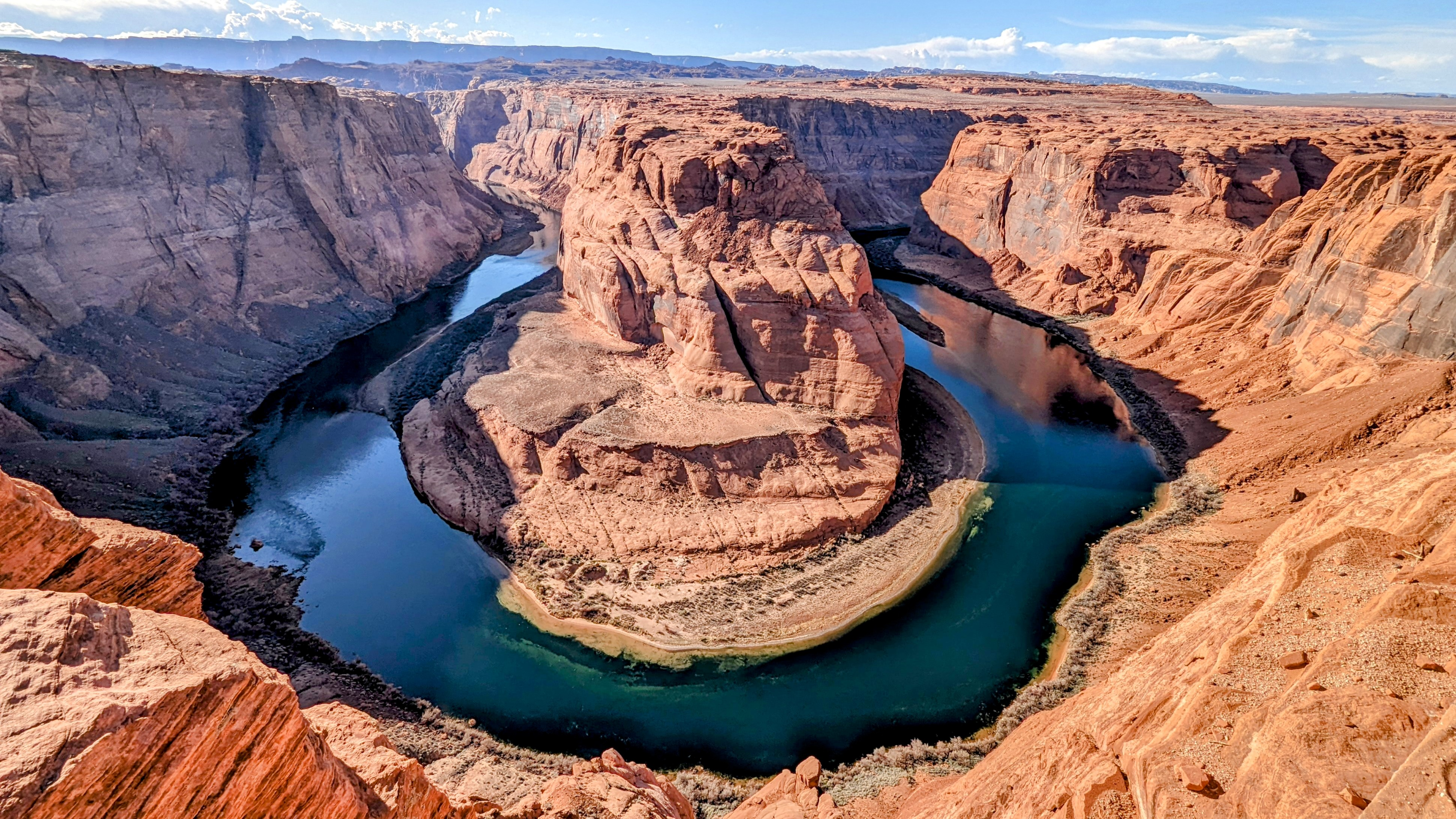
Incised meander caused by downcutting of Colorado River during uplift of Colorado Plateau

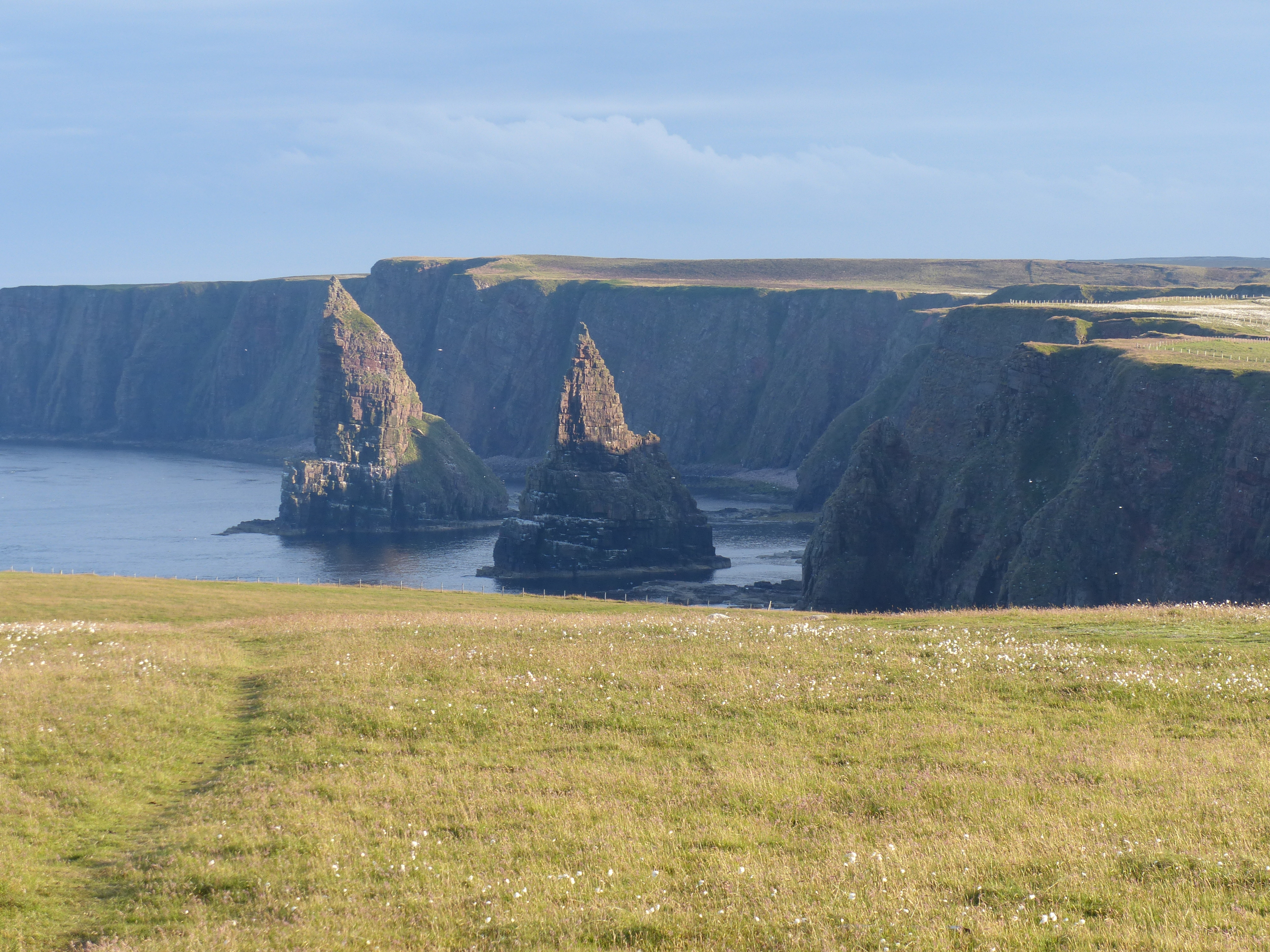
Duncansby Stacks

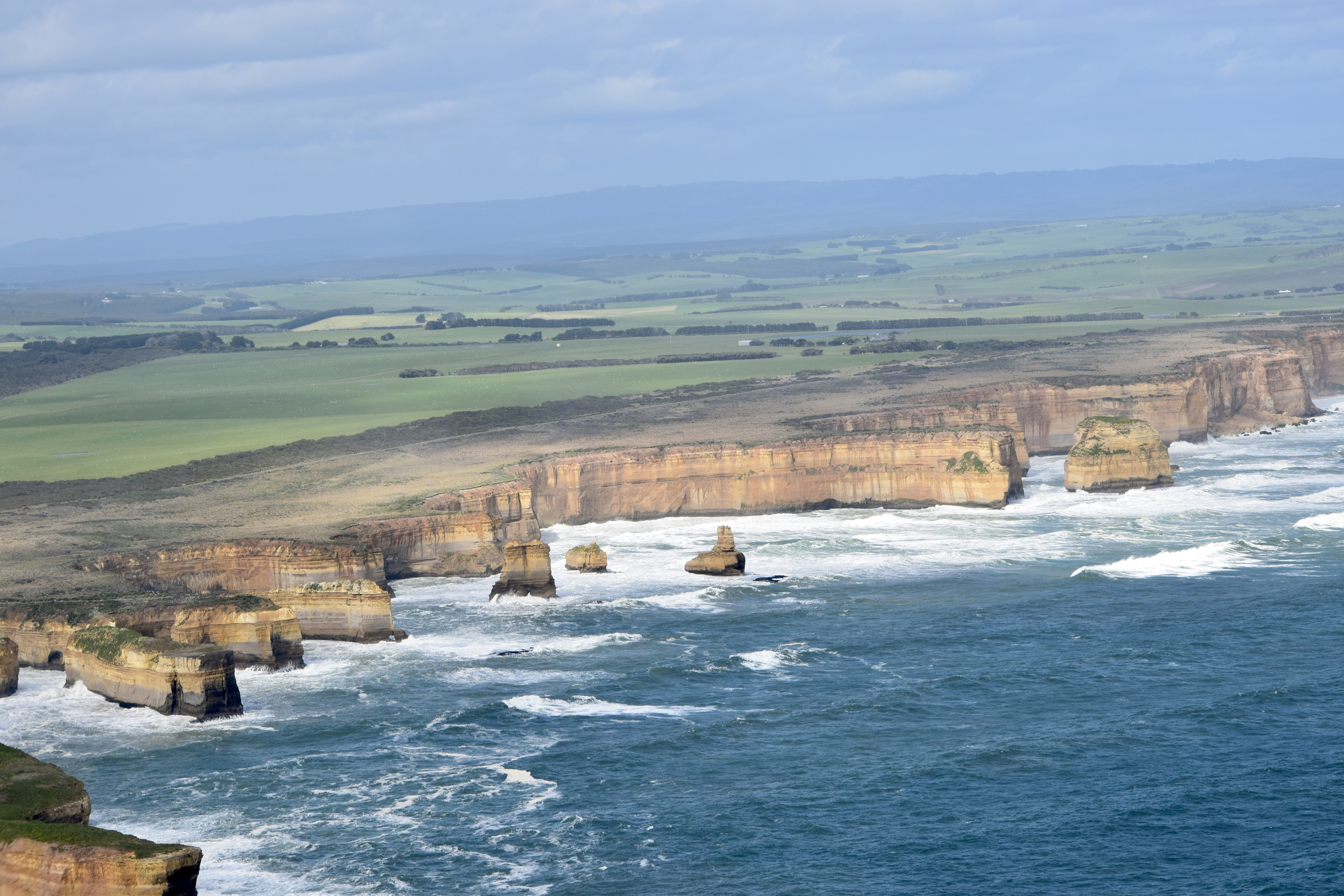
The Twelve Apostles

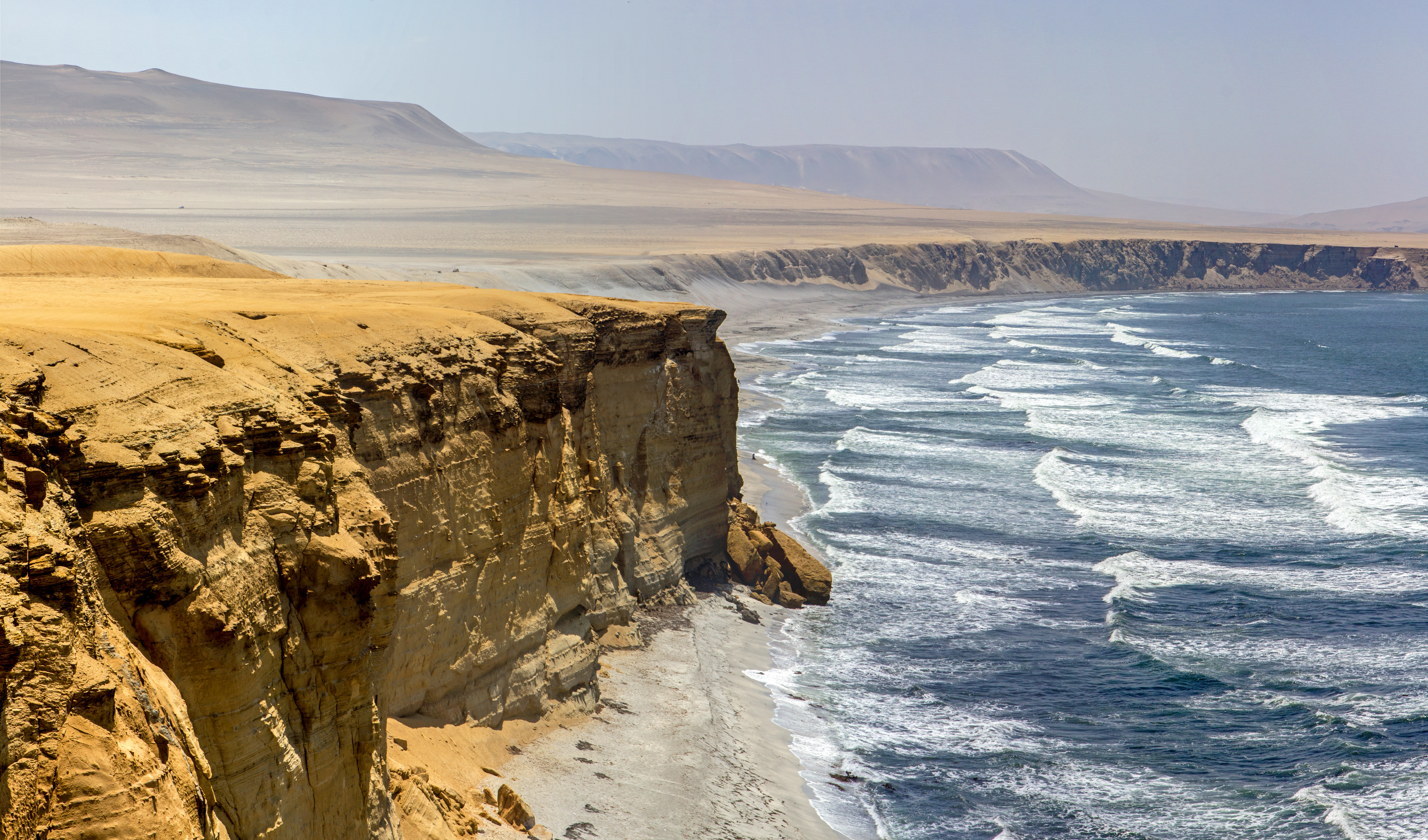
Coast and cliffs of Paracas National Reserve
