= Flexural rigidity =

Resistance offered by a structure while bending

Flexural rigidity is defined as the force couple required to bend a fixed non-rigid structure by one unit of curvature, or as the resistance offered by a structure while undergoing bending.

== Flexural rigidity of a beam ==
Although the moment $M(x)$ and displacement $y$ generally result from external loads and may vary along the length of the beam or rod, the flexural rigidity (defined as $EI$) is a property of the beam itself and is generally constant for prismatic members. However, in cases of non-prismatic members, such as the case of the tapered beams or columns or notched stair stringers, the flexural rigidity will vary along the length of the beam as well. The flexural rigidity, moment, and transverse displacement are related by the following equation along the length of the rod, $x$:

$$\ EI {dy \over dx}\ = \int_{0}^{x} M(x) dx + C_1$$

where $E$ is the flexural modulus (in Pa), $I$ is the second moment of area (in m^{4}), $y$ is the transverse displacement of the beam at x, and $M(x)$ is the bending moment at x. The flexural rigidity (stiffness) of the beam is therefore related to both $E$, a material property, and $I$, the physical geometry of the beam. If the material exhibits Isotropic behavior then the Flexural Modulus is equal to the Modulus of Elasticity (Young's Modulus).

Flexural rigidity has SI units of Pa·m^{4} (which also equals N·m^{2}).

== Flexural rigidity of a plate (e.g. the lithosphere) ==
In the study of geology, lithospheric flexure affects the thin lithospheric plates covering the surface of the Earth when a load or force is applied to them. On a geological timescale, the lithosphere behaves elastically (in first approach) and can therefore bend under loading by mountain chains, volcanoes and other heavy objects. Isostatic depression caused by the weight of ice sheets during the last glacial period is an example of the effects of such loading.

The flexure of the plate depends on:

1. The plate elastic thickness (usually referred to as effective elastic thickness of the lithosphere).
2. The elastic properties of the plate
3. The applied load or force

As flexural rigidity of the plate is determined by the Young's modulus, Poisson's ratio and cube of the plate's elastic thickness, it is a governing factor in both (1) and (2).

Flexural Rigidity $D = \dfrac{Eh_e^3}{12(1-\nu^2)}$

$E$ = Young's Modulus

$h_e$ = elastic thickness (~5–100 km)

$\nu$ = Poisson's Ratio

Flexural rigidity of a plate has units of Pa·m^{3}, i.e. one dimension of length less than the same property for the rod, as it refers to the moment per unit length per unit of curvature, and not the total moment. I is termed as moment of inertia. J is denoted as 2nd moment of inertia/polar moment of inertia.

== See also ==
- Bending stiffness
- Lithospheric flexure
