= Orogeny =

Formation of mountain ranges

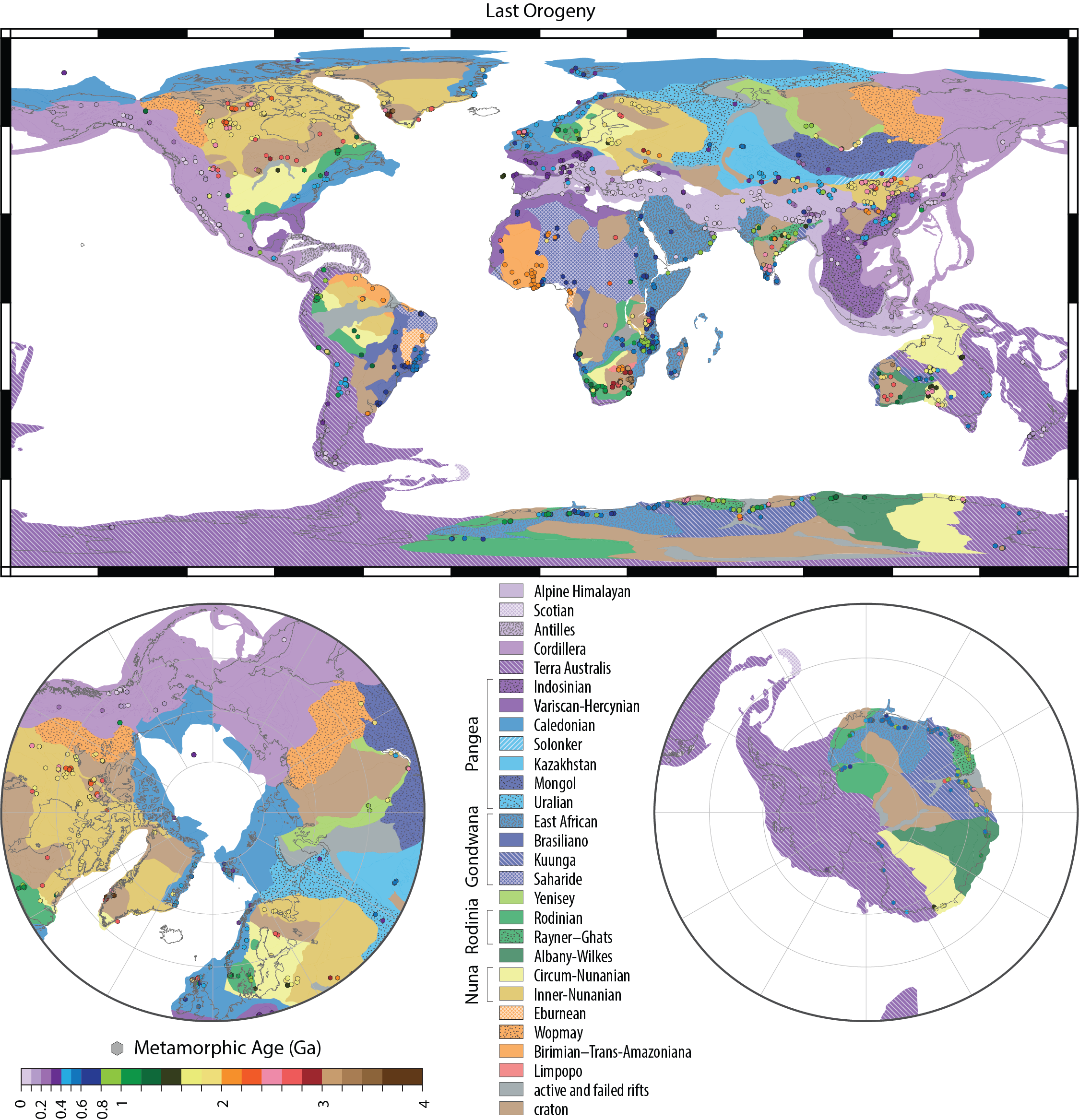
Map of the last orogenies to affect Earth's geologic provinces

Orogeny (/ɒˈrɒdʒəni/) is a mountain-building process that takes place at a convergent plate margin when plate motion compresses the margin. An orogenic belt or orogen develops as the compressed plate crumples and is uplifted to form one or more mountain ranges. This involves a series of geological processes collectively called orogenesis. These include both structural deformation of existing continental crust and the creation of new continental crust through volcanism. Magma rising in the orogen carries less dense material upwards while leaving more dense material behind, resulting in compositional differentiation of Earth's lithosphere (crust and uppermost mantle). A synorogenic (or synkinematic) process or event is one that occurs during an orogeny.

The word orogeny comes from Ancient Greek ὄρος (óros) 'mountain' and γένεσις (génesis) 'creation, origin'. Although it was used before him, the American geologist G. K. Gilbert used the term in 1890 to mean the process of mountain-building, as distinguished from epeirogeny.

== Tectonics ==
Subduction of an oceanic plate beneath a continental plate to form an accretionary orogen (example: the Andes)

Continental collision of two continental plates to form a collisional orogen. Typically, continental crust is subducted to lithospheric depths for blueschist to eclogite facies metamorphism, and then exhumed along the same subduction channel. (example: the Himalayas)

Orogeny takes place on the convergent margins of continents. The convergence may take the form of subduction (where a continent rides forcefully over an oceanic plate to form a noncollisional orogen) or continental collision (convergence of two or more continents to form a collisional orogeny).

Orogeny typically produces orogenic belts or orogens, which are elongated regions of deformation bordering continental cratons (the stable interiors of continents). Young orogenic belts, in which subduction is still taking place, are characterized by frequent volcanic activity and earthquakes. Older orogenic belts are typically deeply eroded to expose displaced and deformed strata. These are often highly metamorphosed and include vast bodies of intrusive igneous rock called batholiths.

Subduction zones consume oceanic crust, thicken lithosphere, and produce earthquakes and volcanoes. Not all subduction zones produce orogenic belts; mountain building takes place only when the subduction produces compression in the overriding plate. Whether subduction produces compression depends on such factors as the rate of plate convergence and the degree of coupling between the two plates, while the degree of coupling may in turn rely on such factors as the angle of subduction and rate of sedimentation in the oceanic trench associated with the subduction zone. The Andes Mountains are an example of a noncollisional orogenic belt, and such belts are sometimes called Andean-type orogens.

As subduction continues, island arcs, continental fragments, and oceanic material may gradually accrete onto the continental margin. This is one of the main mechanisms by which continents have grown. An orogen built of crustal fragments (terranes) accreted over a long period of time, without any indication of a major continent-continent collision, is called an accretionary orogen. The North American Cordillera and the Lachlan Orogen of southeast Australia are examples of accretionary orogens.

The orogeny may culminate with continental crust from the opposite side of the subducting oceanic plate arriving at the subduction zone. This ends subduction and transforms the accretional orogen into a Himalayan-type collisional orogen. The collisional orogeny may produce extremely high mountains, as has been taking place in the Himalayas for the last 65 million years.

The processes of orogeny can take tens of millions of years and build mountains from what were once sedimentary basins. Activity along an orogenic belt can be extremely long-lived. For example, much of the basement underlying the United States belongs to the Transcontinental Proterozoic Provinces, which accreted to Laurentia (the ancient heart of North America) over the course of 200 million years in the Paleoproterozoic. The Yavapai and Mazatzal orogenies were peaks of orogenic activity during this time. These were part of an extended period of orogenic activity that included the Picuris orogeny and culminated in the Grenville orogeny, lasting at least 600 million years. A similar sequence of orogenies has taken place on the west coast of North America, beginning in the late Devonian (about 380 million years ago) with the Antler orogeny and continuing with the Sonoma orogeny and Sevier orogeny and culminating with the Laramide orogeny. The Laramide orogeny alone lasted 40 million years, from 75 million to 35 million years ago.

=== Intraplate orogeny ===
Stresses transmitted from plate boundaries can also lead to episodes of intracontinental transpressional orogeny. Examples in Australia include the Neoproterozoic Petermann Orogeny (630–520 Ma), and the Sprigg Orogeny (Miocene – present).

=== Orogens ===
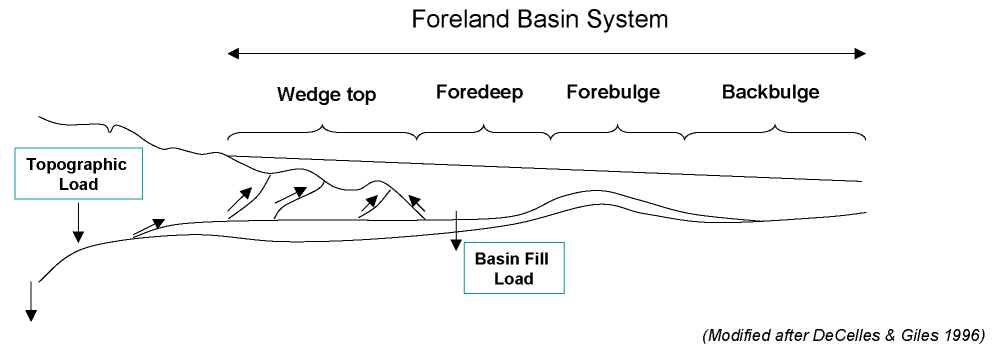
The Foreland Basin System

Orogens show a great range of characteristics, but they may be broadly divided into collisional orogens and noncollisional orogens (Andean-type orogens). Collisional orogens can be further divided by whether the collision is with a second continent or a continental fragment or island arc. Repeated collisions of the latter type, with no evidence of collision with a major continent or closure of an ocean basin, result in an accretionary orogen. Examples of orogens arising from collision of an island arc with a continent include Taiwan and the collision of Australia with the Banda arc. Orogens arising from continent-continent collisions can be divided into those involving ocean closure (Himalayan-type orogens) and those involving glancing collisions with no ocean basin closure (as is taking place today in the Southern Alps of New Zealand).

Orogens have a characteristic structure, though this shows considerable variation. A foreland basin forms ahead of the orogen due mainly to loading and resulting flexure of the lithosphere by the developing mountain belt. A typical foreland basin is subdivided into a wedge-top basin above the active orogenic wedge, the foredeep immediately beyond the active front, a forebulge high of flexural origin and a back-bulge area beyond, although not all of these are present in all foreland-basin systems. The basin migrates with the orogenic front and early deposited foreland basin sediments become progressively involved in folding and thrusting. Sediments deposited in the foreland basin are mainly derived from the erosion of the actively uplifting rocks of the mountain range, although some sediments derive from the foreland. The fill of many such basins shows a change in time from deepwater marine (flysch-style) through shallow water to continental (molasse-style) sediments.

While active orogens are found on the margins of present-day continents, older inactive orogens, such as the Algoman, Penokean and Antler, are represented by deformed and metamorphosed rocks with sedimentary basins further inland.

== Orogenic cycle ==
Long before the acceptance of plate tectonics, geologists had found evidence within many orogens of repeated cycles of deposition, deformation, crustal thickening and mountain building, and crustal thinning to form new depositional basins. These were named orogenic cycles, and various theories were proposed to explain them. Canadian geologist Tuzo Wilson first put forward a plate tectonic interpretation of orogenic cycles, now known as Wilson cycles. Wilson proposed that orogenic cycles represented the periodic opening and closing of an ocean basin, with each stage of the process leaving its characteristic record on the rocks of the orogen.

=== Continental rifting ===
The Wilson cycle begins when previously stable continental crust comes under tension from a shift in mantle convection. Continental rifting takes place, which thins the crust and creates basins in which sediments accumulate. As the basins deepen, the ocean invades the rift zone, and as the continental crust rifts completely apart, shallow marine sedimentation gives way to deep marine sedimentation on the thinned marginal crust of the two continents.

=== Seafloor spreading ===
As the two continents rift apart, seafloor spreading commences along the axis of a new ocean basin. Deep marine sediments continue to accumulate along the thinned continental margins, which are now passive margins.

=== Subduction ===
At some point, subduction is initiated along one or both of the continental margins of the ocean basin, producing a volcanic arc and possibly an Andean-type orogen along that continental margin. This produces deformation of the continental margins and possibly crustal thickening and mountain building.

=== Mountain building ===
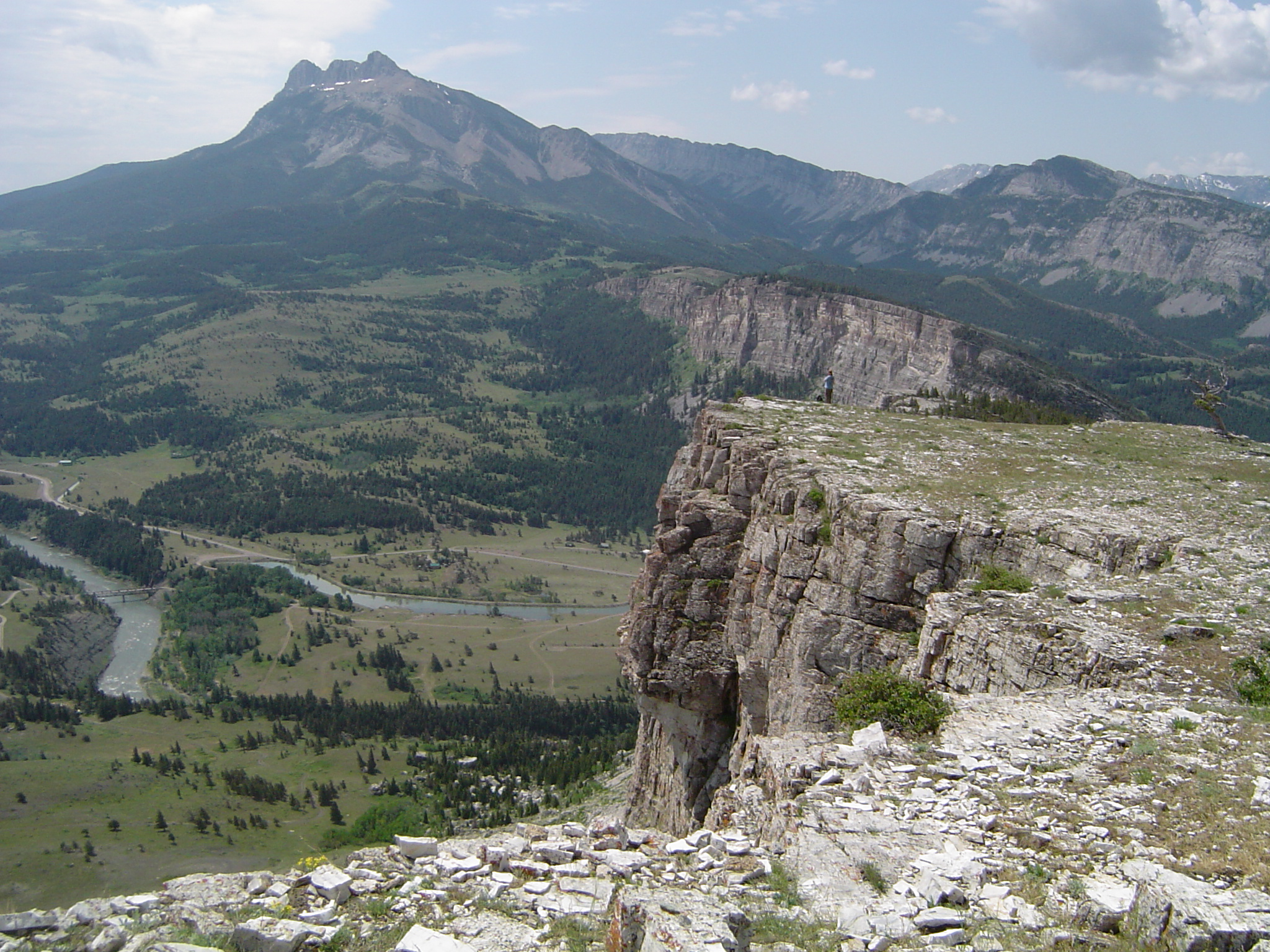
An example of thin-skinned deformation (thrust faulting) of the Sevier Orogeny in Montana. The white Madison Limestone is repeated, with one example in the foreground (that pinches out with distance) and another to the upper right corner and top of the picture.

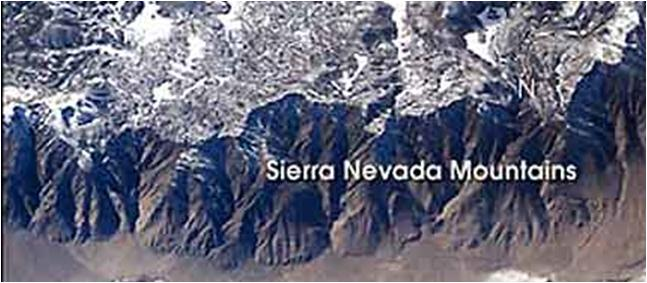
Sierra Nevada Mountains (a result of delamination) as seen from the International Space Station

Mountain formation in orogens is largely a result of crustal thickening. The compressive forces produced by plate convergence result in pervasive deformation of the crust of the continental margin (thrust tectonics). This takes the form of folding of the ductile deeper crust and thrust faulting in the upper brittle crust.

Crustal thickening raises mountains through the principle of isostasy. Isostasy is the balance of the downward gravitational force upon an upthrust mountain range (composed of light, continental crust material) and the buoyant upward forces exerted by the dense underlying mantle.

Portions of orogens can also experience uplift as a result of delamination of the orogenic lithosphere, in which an unstable portion of cold lithospheric root drips down into the asthenospheric mantle, decreasing the density of the lithosphere and causing buoyant uplift. An example is the Sierra Nevada in California. This range of fault-block mountains experienced renewed uplift and abundant magmatism after a delamination of the orogenic root beneath them.

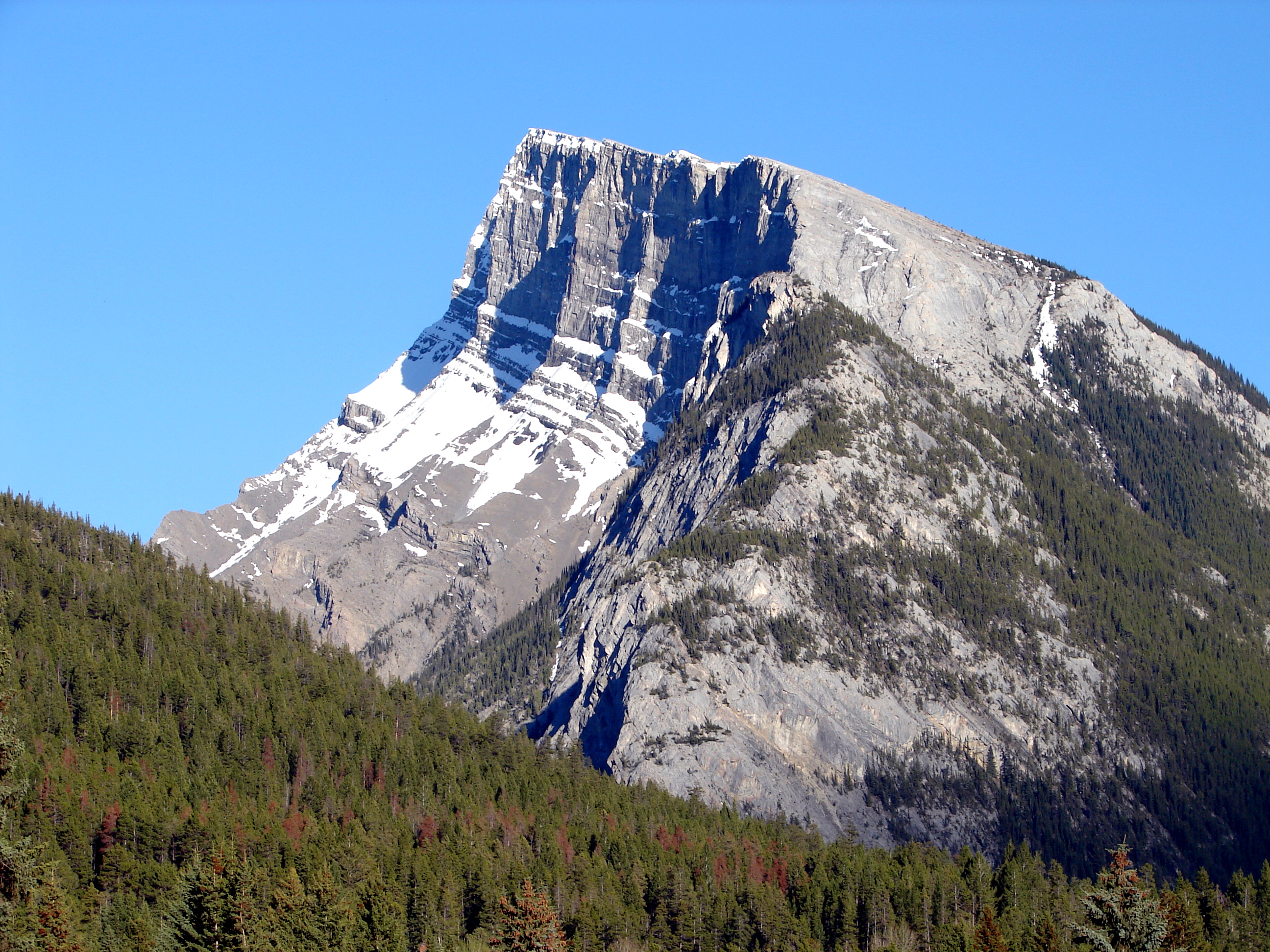
Mount Rundle, Banff, Alberta

Mount Rundle on the Trans-Canada Highway between Banff and Canmore provides a classic example of a mountain cut in dipping-layered rocks. Millions of years ago a collision caused an orogeny, forcing horizontal layers of an ancient ocean crust to be thrust up at an angle of 50–60°. That left Rundle with one sweeping, tree-lined smooth face, and one sharp, steep face where the edge of the uplifted layers are exposed.

Although mountain building mostly takes place in orogens, a number of secondary mechanisms are capable of producing substantial mountain ranges. Areas that are rifting apart, such as mid-ocean ridges and the East African Rift, have mountains due to thermal buoyancy related to the hot mantle underneath them; this thermal buoyancy is known as dynamic topography. In strike-slip orogens, such as the San Andreas Fault, restraining bends result in regions of localized crustal shortening and mountain building without a plate-margin-wide orogeny. Hotspot volcanism results in the formation of isolated mountains and mountain chains that look as if they are not necessarily on present tectonic-plate boundaries, but they are essentially the product of plate tectonism. Likewise, uplift and erosion related to epeirogenesis (large-scale vertical motions of portions of continents without much associated folding, metamorphism, or deformation) can create local topographic highs.

=== Closure of the ocean basin ===
Eventually, seafloor spreading in the ocean basin comes to a halt, and continued subduction begins to close the ocean basin.

=== Continental collision and orogeny ===
The closure of the ocean basin ends with a continental collision and the associated Himalayan-type orogen.

=== Erosion ===
Erosion represents the final phase of the orogenic cycle. Erosion of overlying strata in orogenic belts, and isostatic adjustment to the removal of this overlying mass of rock, can bring deeply buried strata to the surface. The erosional process is called unroofing. Erosion inevitably removes much of the mountains, exposing the core or mountain roots (metamorphic rocks brought to the surface from a depth of several kilometres). Isostatic movements may help such unroofing by balancing out the buoyancy of the evolving orogen. Scholars debate about the extent to which erosion modifies the patterns of tectonic deformation (see erosion and tectonics). Thus, the final form of the majority of old orogenic belts is a long arcuate strip of crystalline metamorphic rocks sequentially below younger sediments which are thrust atop them and which dip away from the orogenic core.

An orogen may be almost completely eroded away, and only recognizable by studying (old) rocks that bear traces of orogenesis. Orogens are usually long, thin, arcuate tracts of rock that have a pronounced linear structure resulting in terranes or blocks of deformed rocks, separated generally by suture zones or dipping thrust faults. These thrust faults carry relatively thin slices of rock (which are called nappes or thrust sheets, and differ from tectonic plates) from the core of the shortening orogen out toward the margins, and are intimately associated with folds and the development of metamorphism.

== History of the concept ==
Before the development of geologic concepts during the 19th century, the presence of marine fossils in mountains was explained in Christian contexts as a result of the Biblical Deluge. This was an extension of Neoplatonic thought, which influenced early Christian writers.

The 13th-century Dominican scholar Albert the Great posited that, as erosion was known to occur, there must be some process whereby new mountains and other land-forms were thrust up, or else there would eventually be no land; he suggested that marine fossils in mountainsides must once have been at the sea-floor. Orogeny was used by Amanz Gressly (1840) and Jules Thurmann (1854) as orogenic in terms of the creation of mountain elevations, as the term mountain building was still used to describe the processes. Elie de Beaumont (1852) used the evocative "Jaws of a Vise" theory to explain orogeny, but was more concerned with the height rather than the implicit structures created by and contained in orogenic belts. His theory essentially held that mountains were created by the squeezing of certain rocks. Eduard Suess (1875) recognised the importance of horizontal movement of rocks. The concept of a precursor geosyncline or initial downward warping of the solid earth (Hall, 1859) prompted James Dwight Dana (1873) to include the concept of compression in the theories surrounding mountain-building. With hindsight, we can discount Dana's conjecture that this contraction was due to the cooling of the Earth (aka the cooling Earth theory). The cooling Earth theory was the chief paradigm for most geologists until the 1960s. It was, in the context of orogeny, fiercely contested by proponents of vertical movements in the crust, or convection within the asthenosphere or mantle.

Gustav Steinmann (1906) recognised different classes of orogenic belts, including the Alpine type orogenic belt, typified by a flysch and molasse geometry to the sediments; ophiolite sequences, tholeiitic basalts, and a nappe style fold structure.

In terms of recognising orogeny as an event, Leopold von Buch (1855) recognised that orogenies could be placed in time by bracketing between the youngest deformed rock and the oldest undeformed rock, a principle which is still in use today, though commonly investigated by geochronology using radiometric dating.

Based on available observations from the metamorphic differences in orogenic belts of Europe and North America, H. J. Zwart (1967) proposed three types of orogens in relationship to tectonic setting and style: Cordillerotype, Alpinotype, and Hercynotype. His proposal was revised by W. S. Pitcher in 1979 in terms of the relationship to granite occurrences. Cawood et al. (2009) categorized orogenic belts into three types: accretionary, collisional, and intracratonic. Both accretionary and collisional orogens developed in converging plate margins. In contrast, Hercynotype orogens generally show similar features to intracratonic, intracontinental, extensional, and ultrahot orogens, all of which developed in continental detachment systems at converged plate margins.

1. Accretionary orogens, which were produced by subduction of one oceanic plate beneath one continental plate for arc volcanism. They are dominated by calc-alkaline igneous rocks and high-T/low-P metamorphic facies series at high thermal gradients of >30 °C/km. There is a general lack of ophiolites, migmatites and abyssal sediments. Typical examples are all circum-Pacific orogens containing continental arcs.
2. Collisional orogens, which were produced by subduction of one continental block beneath the other continental block with the absence of arc volcanism. They are typified by the occurrence of blueschist to eclogite facies metamorphic zones, indicating high-P/low-T metamorphism at low thermal gradients of <10 °C/km. Orogenic peridotites are present but volumetrically minor, and syn-collisional granites and migmatites are also rare or of only minor extent. Typical examples are the Alps-Himalaya orogens in the southern margin of Eurasian continent and the Dabie-Sulu orogens in east-central China.
3. Intracratonic orogens occur within a continent, away from active plate margins.

== See also ==
- Biogeography – Study of distribution of species
- Epeirogenic movement – Upheavals or depressions of land exhibiting long wavelengths and little folding
- Fault mechanics – Field of study that investigates the behavior of geologic faults
- Fold mountains – Mountains formed by compressive crumpling of the layers of rock
- Guyot – Flat-topped underwater mountain
- List of orogenies – Known mountain building events of the Earth's history
- Mantle convection – Gradual movement of the planet's mantle
- Tectonic uplift – Geologic uplift of Earth's surface that is attributed to plate tectonics
