= Effective elastic thickness of the lithosphere =

Effective elastic thickness of the lithosphere is the estimated thickness of the elastic plate to substitute for lithosphere in order to investigate observed deformation. It is also presented as T_{e} (effective or equivalent).

== Effective elastic thickness of the oceanic lithosphere ==
T_{e} is largely dependent on the thermal structure of the lithosphere, its thickness and the coupling of crust with mantle. For the oceanic lithosphere with coupled crust and mantle, T_{e} is usually taken to the base of the mechanical lithosphere (isotherm of 500 - 600 °C). This way it is also age dependent, as gradually thickens moving off the oceanic ridge.

== Effective elastic thickness of the continental lithosphere ==
For the continental lithosphere more aspects are taken under consideration, thermal age is only the estimate for slowly cooling cratonic areas, where mantle is involved and T_{e} reaches large values. Similar conditions are expected also on terrestrial planets. If the crust is decoupled from mantle, value follows the average crustal thickness. Topography load is also important factor, significantly lowering the value of T_{e}.

== Methods of determination ==
Methods for T_{e} determination on continents are mostly based on thermal and rheological approach, but also on comparison of gravity anomalies and topography. For thermally young areas Te is about 20-30 km, for older 40-50 km, cratons can reach more than 100 km. Determination of the effective elastic thickness is important for Earth's surface deformation studies, warp tectonics, glacial isostatic rebound and sea-level changes.

== See also ==
- Lithospheric flexure
