= Geophysical global cooling =

Before the concept of plate tectonics, global cooling was a geophysical theory by James Dwight Dana, also referred to as the contracting earth theory. It suggested that the Earth had been in a molten state, and features such as mountains formed as it cooled and shrank. As the interior of the Earth cooled and shrank, the rigid crust would have to shrink and crumple. The crumpling could produce features such as mountain ranges.

== Application ==
The Earth was compared to a cooling ball of iron, or a steam boiler with shifting boiler plates. By the early 1900s, it was known that temperature increased with increasing depth. With the thickness of the crust, the "boiler plates", being estimated at ten to fifty miles, the downward pressure would be hundreds of thousands of pounds per square inch. Although groundwater was expected to turn to steam at a great depth, usually the downward pressure would contain any steam. Steam's effect upon molten rock was suspected of being a cause of volcanoes and earthquakes, as it had been noticed that most volcanoes are near water. It was not clear whether the molten rock from volcanoes had its origin in the molten rock under the crust, or if increased heat due to pressure under mountains caused the rock to melt. One of the reasons for volcanoes was as a way in which "the contracting earth disposes of the matter it can no longer contain." A relationship between earthquakes and volcanoes had been noted, although the causes were not known. Fault lines and earthquakes tended to happen along the boundaries of the shifting "boiler plates", but the folding of mountains indicated that sometimes the plates buckled.

In the early 1900s, Professor Eduard Suess used the theory to explain the 1908 Messina earthquake, being of the opinion that the Earth's crust was gradually shrinking everywhere. He also predicted that eruptions would follow the earthquake and tsunami in Southern Italy. He attributed the earthquake to the sinking of the Earth's crust, in the zone of which the Aeolian Islands are the center. He declared that as the process of sinking went on, the Calabrian and Sicilian highlands on either side of the Straits of Messina would be submerged, only the highest peaks remaining above the sea. The strait, he said, would thereby be greatly widened.

Similarly, Professor Robert T. Hill explained at that time that "the rocks are being folded, fractured and otherwise broken or deformed by the great shrinking and settling of the earth's crust as a whole. The contraction of the earth's sphere is the physical shrinkage of age that is measured in aeons instead of years. The prehistoric convulsions of the earth before man inhabited this planet were terrific, almost inconceivable." There "was no doubt that earthquakes are diminishing." The displacement of the 1906 San Francisco earthquake was only a few feet, while prehistoric earthquakes made fissures and slides of 20,000 feet.

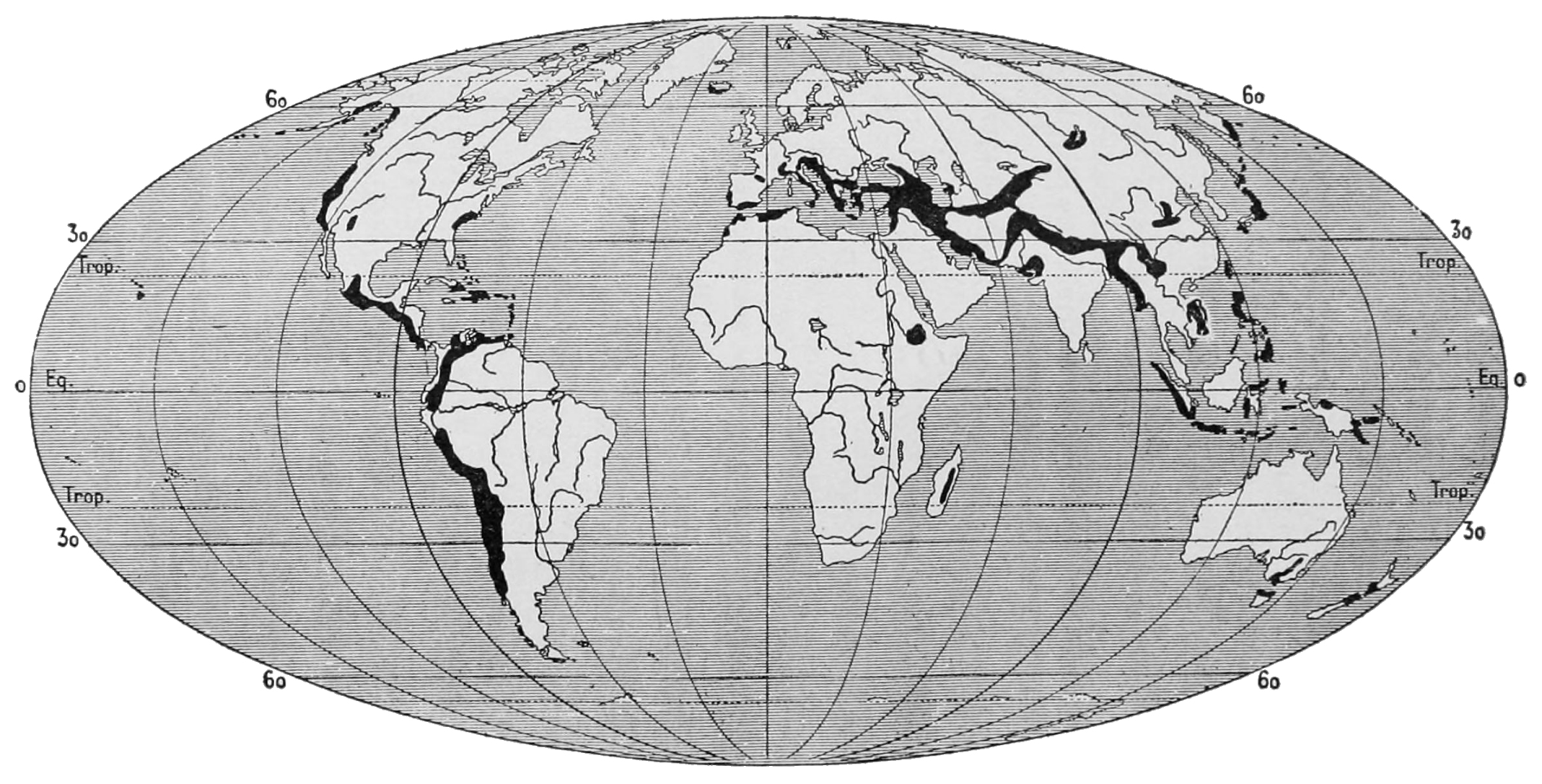
1906 map of earthquake regions

The Pacific Ring of Fire had been noticed, as well as a second earthquake belt which went through:

- the Philippines
- Panama
- the Caribbean
- Spain
- the Alps
- the Himalayas
- Asia to Japan

A contracting Earth served as framework for Leopold Kober and Hans Stille who worked on geosyncline theory in the first half of the 20th century.

== Objections ==
Some of the objections include:

- Some large-scale features of the Earth are the result of extension rather than shortening.
- After radioactive decay was discovered, it was realized it would release heat inside the planet. This undermines the cooling effect upon which the shrinking planet theory is based.
- Identical fossils have been found thousands of kilometres apart, showing the planet was once a single continent which broke apart because of plate tectonics.

== Current status ==
This theory is now disproven and considered obsolete. In contrast to Earth, however, global cooling remains the dominant explanation for scarp (cliff) features on the planet Mercury. After resumption of Lunar exploration in the 1990s, it was discovered there are scarps across the Moon's surface which are caused by contraction due to cooling.

== See also ==
- Expanding Earth
- Timeline of the development of tectonophysics

== Bibliography ==
- Şengör, Celâl (1982). "Classical theories of orogenesis". In Miyashiro, Akiho; Aki, Keiiti; Şengör, Celâl (eds.). Orogeny. John Wiley & Sons. ISBN 0-471-103764.
