= Hendrik Enno Boeke =

Dutch mineralogist and petrographer (1881–1918)

Hendrik Enno Boeke (12 September 1881, in Wormerveer – 6 December 1918, in Frankfurt am Main) was a Dutch mineralogist and petrographer.

From 1900 he studied chemistry and physics at the University of Amsterdam, where his instructors included Hendrik Willem Bakhuis Roozeboom and Johannes Diderik van der Waals. He then worked as an assistant under Gustav Tammann in Göttingen and to Friedrich Rinne at the Technical University of Hannover. In 1909 he became a lecturer of chemistry at the University of Königsberg, and during the following year, an associate professor of physical-chemical mineralogy and petrology at the University of Leipzig.

In 1911 he relocated to the University of Halle as an associate professor of mineralogy and petrology. In 1912 he was invited by the Carnegie Foundation to the United States, mainly to work at the Geophysical Laboratory in Washington DC. From 1914 to 1918 he was a full professor of mineralogy at the University of Frankfurt am Main, during which time period, he also worked at the University of Ghent.

He is remembered for introducing mathematical and physico-chemical mindsets and working methods into the field of petrography. His research included studies of magma rock and salt deposits.

== Selected works ==
- Übersicht der Mineralogie, petrographie und Geologie der Kalisalz-Lagerstätten, 1909 – Overview involving the mineralogy, petrography and geology of potash deposits.
- Die Anwendung der stereographischen Projektion bei kristallographischen Untersuchungen, Berlin 1911 – The application of the stereographic projection in crystallographic studies.
- Die gnomonische Projektion in ihrer Anwendung auf Kristallographische Aufgaben, Berlin 1913 – The gnomonic projection in its application to crystallographic tasks.
- Grundlagen der physikalisch-chemischen Petrographie, Berlin 1915 – Fundamentals of physico-chemical petrology.
