= Paired metamorphic belts =

Parallel linear rock units

Paired metamorphic belts are sets of parallel linear rock units that display contrasting metamorphic mineral assemblages. These paired belts develop along convergent plate boundaries where subduction is active. Each pair consists of one belt with a low-temperature, high-pressure metamorphic mineral assemblage, and another characterized by high-temperature, low-pressure metamorphic minerals.

== Historical background ==
The concept of paired metamorphic belts was originally theorized by the Japanese geologist, Akiho Miyashiro in 1961. The parallel arrangement between the metamorphic belts and the similar ages of each belt, led Miyashiro to the idea that metamorphic belts formed together as pairs. The introduction of the paradigm of plate tectonics in the late 1960s, led to a better understanding of regional metamorphism and permitted the association between paired metamorphic belts and subduction zones.

== Conditions of formation ==
The asymmetric deformation of Earth's lithosphere along subduction zones produces two distinct thermal environments. These two distinct thermal conditions are parallel to the trend of the subduction zone. Low temperature, high pressure conditions are generated in the areas along the oceanic trench, whereas high temperature, low pressure conditions are generated beneath the arc region.

A positive thermal gradient is visualized, extending from the colder oceanic trench to the warmer arc region. The thermal and barometric conditions within these 2 regions are recorded and preserved through distinct types of metamorphism and mineral assemblages.

== Mineral assemblages ==
Detailed research on constraints of metamorphic mineral stability fields allows accurate inference of previous regional thermal and barometric conditions.

- Low temperature, high pressure conditions are characterized by blueschist facies and eclogite facies. Common minerals include: lawsonite, garnet, glaucophane, coesite, pumpellyite, hematite. Such mineral assemblages indicate temperatures of 500-800 degree Celsius at pressure of 2.5-3.5 GPa.
- High temperature, low pressure conditions are characterized by granulite facies and amphibolite facies. Common mineral include: sillimanite, quartz, cordierite, orthopyroxenes. Such a mineral assemblage is indicative of temperatures reaching 1000 degrees Celsius at pressure of 0.5-1.3 GPa.

== Geothermal gradient ==
Metamorphic belts are a consequence of thermal perturbations, due to low temperature with respect to pressure ratios (dT/dP) in oceanic trenches and high temperature with respect to pressure ratios (dT/dP) in arcs. Paired metamorphic belts are the product of subducted colder crustal rocks, which are taken to depth, metamorphosed and then exhumed. However, if the rock unit is not exhumed relatively quickly after subduction ceases, the rock unit will re-equilibrate to the standard geothermal gradient and the geological record will be lost.

== Application ==
Paired metamorphic belts permit the inference of subduction directions and relative plate motions at various points in the past. For example, the Ryoke/Sanbagawa paired metamorphic belt in eastern Japan displays a metamorphic sequence indicating a north-west subduction direction. Whereas the Hidaka/Kamuikotu paired metamorphic belt on the western coast of Japan exhibits opposite orientation, indicating a different subduction direction. Furthermore, by dating paired metamorphic belts, the origin of present-day tectonic subduction mechanisms (asymmetric subduction) can be inferred.

== Recent discoveries ==
In recent years, greater knowledge of processes along convergent plate boundaries has caused skepticism about this simplistic model. Observations indicate convergent boundaries typically display oblique motion. The implications of such observations demonstrate the possibility that metamorphic belts could have formed in different sectors of the same subduction margin and became juxtaposed afterwards. Furthermore, accreting allochthonous terrains along subduction zones as a mechanism, encourages the skepticism. The contrasting metamorphic assemblages may have been produced from remote environments. Moreover, the realization that most metamorphic belts are not the product of a single geothermal gradient indicates a more complex mechanism.
