= Leopold Kober =

Austrian geologist

Leopold Kober (21 September 1883 – 6 September 1970), an Austrian geologist, proposed a number of (subsequently largely discredited) theories of orogeny and coined the term kratogen to describe stable continental crust, which was later shortened to kraton by Hans Stille. Kober, developing geosyncline theory, posited that stable blocks known as forelands move toward each other forcing the sediments of the intervening geosynclinal region to move over the forelands and forming marginal mountain ranges known as Randketten, while leaving an intervening median mass known as the Zwischengebirge.
