= Friedrich Rinne =

German mineralogist, crystallographer and petrographer

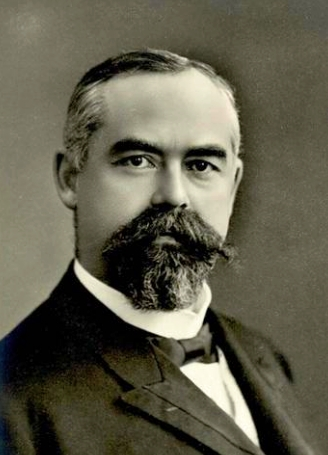
Friedrich Rinne

Friedrich Wilhelm Berthold Rinne (16 March 1863 in Osterode am Harz – 12 March 1933 in Freiburg im Breisgau) was a German mineralogist, crystallographer and petrographer.

== Biography ==
From 1880 he studied natural sciences at the University of Göttingen, where he was a pupil of Adolf von Koenen. After receiving his habilitation, he was a lecturer at Göttingen (1885–87) and at the University of Berlin (1887–94), and from 1894 onward, was a professor of mineralogy and geology at the Technical University of Hannover. Following brief stays at the universities of Königsberg and Kiel, he obtained the chair of mineralogy at the University of Leipzig (1909). After his retirement in 1928, he was named an honorary professor at the University of Freiburg.

At the University of Freiburg, he established the Friedrich-Rinne-Stiftung, a foundation that provided assistance for students of mineralogy in Göttingen and Freiburg. Today, the Friedrich-Rinne-Preis is awarded to outstanding dissertation theses in the field of mineralogy at the universities of Freiburg, Göttingen and Leipzig.

He is remembered for his application of quantitative physical-mechanical and physicochemical techniques to geosciences. He was among the first scientists to use x-rays in the structural analysis of minerals. Encouraged by the work of Hendrik Enno Boeke and Jacobus Henricus van't Hoff, he founded the discipline of Salzpetrographie (salt petrography). In 1909 the mineral "rinneite" was named in his honor.

== Selected works ==
His book, Die Kristalle als Vorbilder des feinbaulichen Wesens der Materie (1921), was translated into English and published with the title "Crystals and the fine-structure of matter" (translated by Walter S. Stiles, 1922). Other noted written efforts by Rinne include:

- Elementare anleitung zu kristallographisch-optischen untersuchungen, vornehmlich mit hilfe des polarisationsmikroskops, 1912 – Basic instructions for crystallographically-optical investigations, mainly by means via the polarizing microscope.
- Gesteinskunde für studierende der naturwissenschaft, forstkunde und landwirtschaft, bauingenieure, architekten und bergingenieure, 1914 – Petrology for students of natural sciences, forestry science and agriculture, mining engineers, architects and construction engineers.
- Einführung in die kristallographische Formenlehre und elementare Anleitung zu kristallographisch-optischen sowie röntgenographischen Untersuchungen, 1922 – Introduction to crystallographic morphology and an elemental guide to crystallographically-optical and X-ray examinations.
