= Neocomian =

Geological time period

In geology, Neocomian was a name given to the lowest stage of the Cretaceous system. It is generally considered to encompass the interval now covered by the Berriasian, Valanginian and Hauterivian, from approximately 145 to 130 Ma. It was introduced by Jules Thurmann in 1835 on account of the development of these rocks at Neuchâtel (Neocomum), Switzerland. It has been employed in more than one sense. In the type area the rocks have been divided into two sub-stages, a lower, Valanginian (from Valengin, Pierre Jean Édouard Desor, 1854) and an upper, Hauterivian (from Hauterive, Eugène Renevier, 1874); there is also another local sub-stage, the infra-Valanginian or Berriasian (from Berrias, Henri Coquand, 1876). These three sub-stages constitute the Neocomian in its restricted sense. Adolf von Koenen and other German geologists extend the use of the term to include the whole of the Lower Cretaceous up to the top of the Gault or Albian. Eugène Renevier divided the Lower Cretaceous into the Neocomian division, embracing the three sub-stages mentioned above, and an Urgonian division, including the Barremian, Rhodanian and Aptian sub-stages. Sir A. Geikie (Text Book of Geology, 4th ed., 1903) regards Neocomian as synonymous with Lower Cretaceous, and he, like Renevier, closes this portion of the system at the top of the Lower Greensand (Aptian). Other British geologists (A. J. Jukes-Browne, &c.) restrict the Neocomian to the marine beds of Speeton and Tealby, and their estuarine equivalents, the Weald Clay and Hastings Sands (Wealden). Much confusion would be avoided by dropping the term Neocomian entirely and employing instead, for the type area, the sub-divisions given above. This becomes the more obvious when it is pointed out that the Berriasian type is limited to Dauphine; the Valanginian has not a much wider range; and the Hauterivian does not extend north of the Paris basin.

Characteristic fossils of the Berriasian are Hoplites euthymi, H. occitanicus; of the Valanginian, Natica leviathan, Belémnites pistilliformis and B. dilatatus, Oxynoticeras Gevrili; of the Hauterivian, Hoplites radiatus, Crioceras capricornu, Exogyra Couloni and Toxaster complanatus. The marine equivalents of these rocks in England are the lower Speeton Clays of Yorkshire and the Tealby beds of Lincolnshire. The Wealden beds of southern England represent approximately an estuarine phase of deposit of the same age. The Hils clay of Germany and Wealden of Hanover; the limestones and shales of Teschen; the Aptychus and Pygope diphyoides marls of Spain, and the Petchorian formation of Russia are equivalents of the Neocomian in its narrower sense.
