= Adolf von Koenen =

German geologist

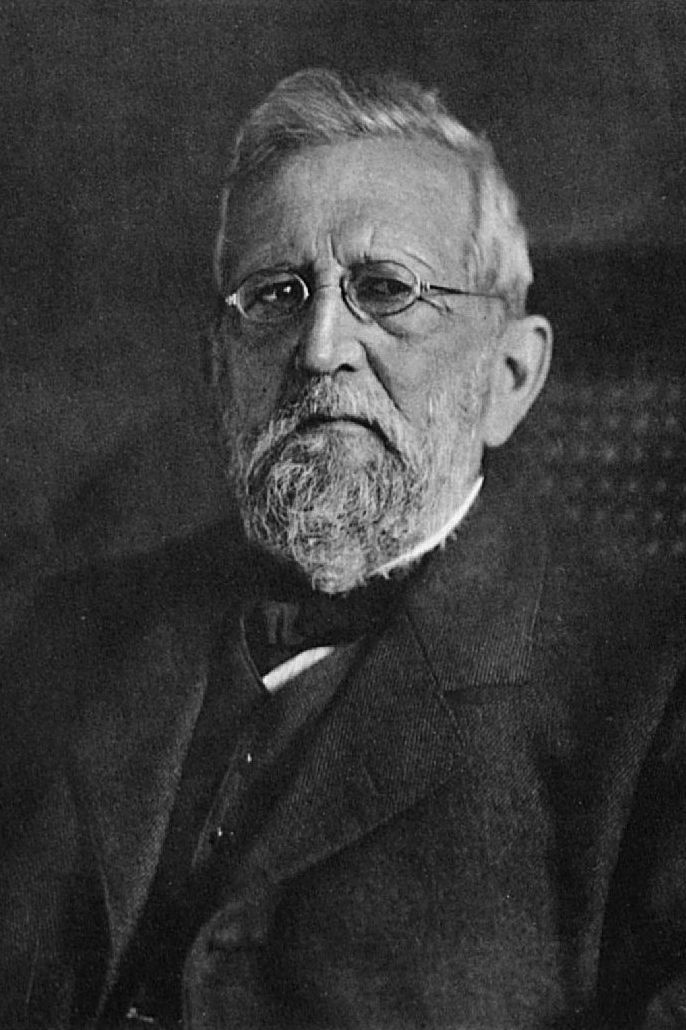
Adolf von Koenen

Adolf von Koenen (21 March 1837, Potsdam – 5 May 1915, Göttingen) was a German geologist best remembered for his paleontological research of northern Germany.

He received his education in Berlin, and following study trips through Belgium, England and France, he obtained his habilitation at the University of Marburg in 1867. In 1878 he became a full professor at Marburg, then relocated to the University of Göttingen in 1881 as a professor of geology. At Göttingen one of his better known students was mineralogist Friedrich Rinne.

His name is associated with koenenite, a mineral that he discovered, and Ctenosauriscus koeneni, a sail-backed reptile from the Early Triassic.

== Selected works ==
- Ueber eine Paleocäne Fauna von Kopenhagen, 1885 – On the Paleocene fauna of Copenhagen.
- Das norddeutsche Unter-Oligocän und seine mollusken Fauna, 1889 – On the north German Lower Oligocene and its mollusks.
- Die Ammonitiden des norddeutschen Neocom (Valanginien, Hautierivien, Barrêmien und Aptien), 1902 – Ammonitida of the north German Neocomian (Valanginian, Hauterivian, Barremian and Aptian).
- Ueber die untere kreide Helgolands und ihre ammonitiden, 1904 – On the lower Cretaceous of Helgoland and its ammonites.
- Die Polyptychites-Arten des Unteren Valanginien, 1909 – Polyptychites-types of the Lower Valanginian
- De Platylenticeras-Arten des Untersten Valanginien Nordwest-Deutschlands, 1915 – Platylenticeras-types of the Lower Valanginian of northwestern Germany.
