= Dorsa Stille =

Wrinkle ridge system on the Moon

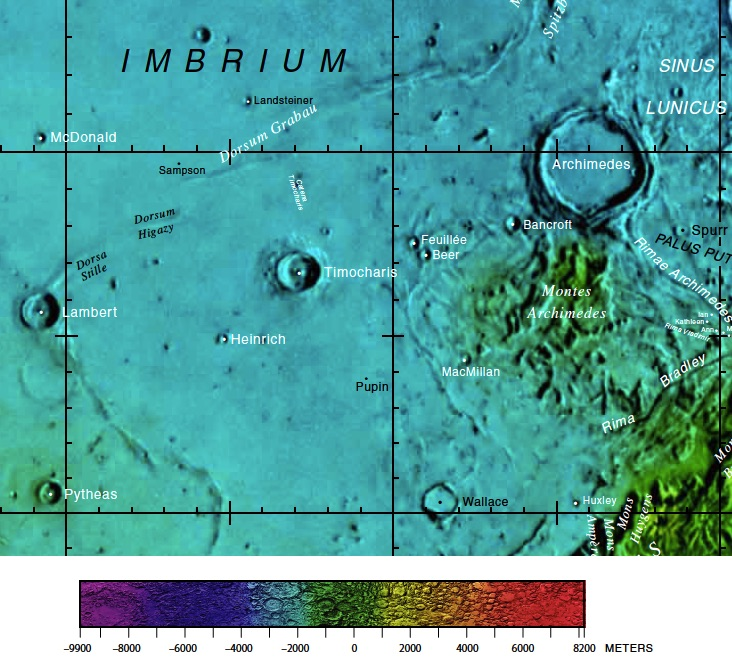
An image of the Dorsa stille on the moon (middle left)

Dorsa Stille is a wrinkle ridge system at 27.0°N 19.0°W in Mare Imbrium on the Moon. It is 66 km long and was named after German geologist Hans Stille in 1976.
