= Craton =

Old and stable part of the continental lithosphere

Cratons of South America and Africa during the Triassic Period when the two continents were joined as part of the Pangea supercontinent

In geology, a craton ( /ˈkreɪtɒn/ KRAYT-on, /ˈkrætɒn/ KRAT-on, or /ˈkreɪtən/ KRAY-tən; from Ancient Greek κράτος (kratos) 'strength') is an old and stable part of continental lithosphere (the Earth's two topmost layers, the crust and the lithospheric mantle). Having often survived cycles of merging and rifting of continents, cratons are generally found in the interiors of tectonic plates; the exceptions occur where geologically recent rifting events have separated cratons and created passive margins along their edges. Cratons are made up of old, crystalline (igneous and metamorphic) basement rocks, sometimes covered by younger sedimentary rocks. Portions of cratons where such sedimentary layers exist are known as platforms, whereas regions with exposed basement rock are called shields. They have a thick crust and deep lithospheric roots extending several hundred kilometres into Earth's mantle.

Cratons contain the oldest continental crust rocks on Earth. They were formed in the Archaean (4 to 2.5 billion years ago) and the Proterozoic (2.5 billion- 538.8 million year ago) geologic eons. Most were formed in the Archaean.

== Terminology ==
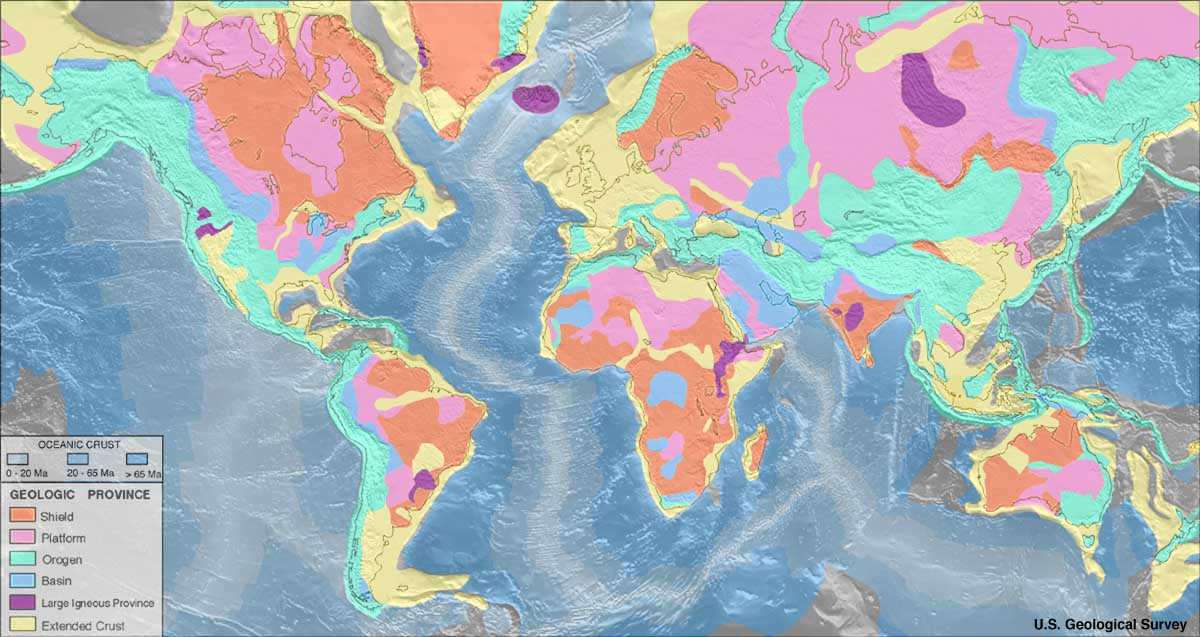
Geologic provinces of the world (USGS) Shield Platform Orogen Basin Large igneous province Extended crust Oceanic crust: 0–20 Ma 20–65 Ma >65 Ma

The term craton refers to the most geologically stable parts of the crust, distinguishing them from regions that are newer or have seen comparatively recent geological activity.

Bleeker and Davis (2004) define a craton as "a large, coherent domain of Earth's continental crust that has attained and maintained long-term stability, having undergone little internal deformation, except perhaps near its margins due to interaction with neighbouring terranes."

Scott King (2005) define the Archaean cratons as "relatively flat, stable regions of the crust that have remained undeformed since the Precambrian, forming the ancient cores of the continents."

In a continental shield, the cratonic basement of igneous and metamorphic rocks is exposed at or near the surface, as opposed to a platform, where a younger, weakly deformed sedimentary cover overlies the basement. Shields and platforms are physiographic terms rather than tectonic entities.

The word craton was first proposed by the Austrian geologist Leopold Kober in 1921 as Kratogen, referring to stable continental platforms, and orogen as a term for mountain or orogenic belts. Later Hans Stille shortened the former term to Kraton, from which craton derives.

== Examples ==
Examples of cratons are the Dharwar Craton in India, North China Craton, the East European Craton, the Amazonian Craton in South America, the Kaapvaal craton in South Africa, the North American Craton (also called the Laurentia Craton), the Gawler craton in South Australia, the Archean Wyoming Craton, and the Superior Craton in Canada.

== Roots ==
Beneath the crust, cratons have deep roots (or keels) in the mantle. According to seismic tomography, the mantle is anomalously cold under cratons as opposed to other, non-cratonic crust. This suggests that the lithosphere extends from 150 km (90 mi) to 300 km (190 mi) under the surface, compared to less than 100 km (60 mi) for mature oceanic lithosphere. At that depth, craton roots extend into the asthenosphere, and the low-velocity zone seen elsewhere at these depths is weak or absent beneath stable cratons. While the colder temperatures mean greater density due to thermal contraction, cratons have a relatively low intrinsic density that give them neutral or positive buoyancy (unlike the much younger oceanic lithosphere).

The mineral composition of the lithosphere deep below the surface is largely understood through xenoliths, rock fragments carried up from the mantle by magma. Peridotite fragments are particularly important due to the dominance of peridotite in the upper mantle. Craton peridotite moisture content is unusually low, which leads to much greater strength. It also contains high percentages of low-weight magnesium instead of higher-weight calcium and iron. Harzburgite peridotites represent the crystalline residues after extraction of melts of compositions like basalt and komatiite.

== Formation ==
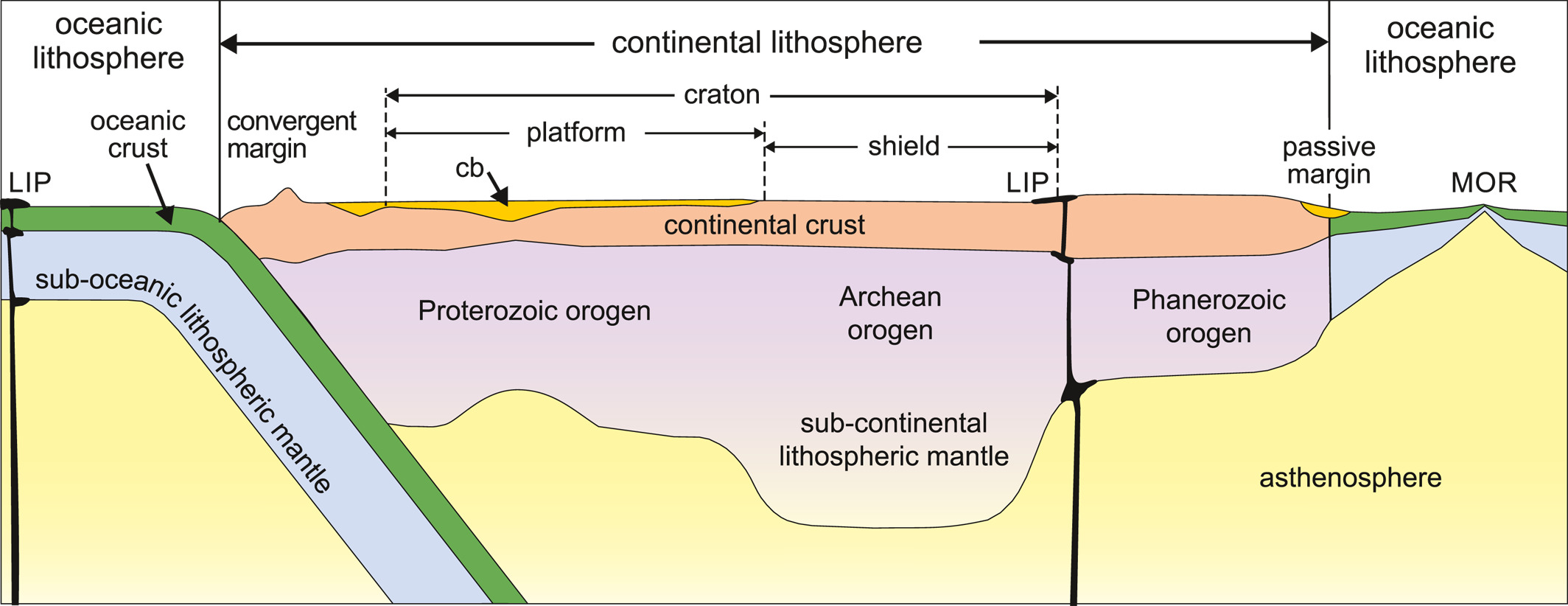
Idealized cross-section of Earth's lithosphere, including the relationship between cratons, shields and platforms (Abbreviations: cb=cratonic basin, LIP=large igneous province, MOR=mid-ocean ridge)

The process by which cratons were formed is called cratonization. Much about this process remains uncertain, with very little consensus in the scientific community. However, the first cratonic landmasses likely formed during the Archean eon. This is indicated by the age of diamonds, which originate in the roots of cratons and are almost always over 2 billion years and often over 3 billion years in age. Though the Archaean represented a substantial growth in the continental crust, ending with a volume similar to today's, relatively little Archaean rock remains. The Archeon eon makes approximately around 3% of the Earth's current surface, but all continents on earth contain crust from it. Cratonization likely was completed during the Proterozoic. Subsequent growth of continents was by accretion at continental margins.

=== Root origin ===
The origin of the roots of cratons is still debated. However, the present understanding of cratonization began with the publication in 1978 of a paper by Thomas H. Jordan in Nature. Jordan proposes that cratons formed from a high degree of partial melting of the upper mantle, with 30 to 40 per cent of the source rock entering the melt. Such a high degree of melting was possible because of the high mantle temperatures of the Archean. The extraction of so much magma left behind a solid peridotite residue that was enriched in lightweight magnesium and thus lower in chemical density than the undepleted mantle. This lower chemical density compensated for the effects of thermal contraction as the craton and its roots cooled so that the physical density of the cratonic roots matched that of the surrounding hotter but more chemically dense mantle. In addition to cooling the craton roots and lowering their chemical density, the extraction of magma also increased the viscosity and melting temperature of the craton roots and prevented mixing with the surrounding undepleted mantle. The resulting mantle roots have remained stable for billions of years. Jordan suggests that depletion occurred primarily in subduction zones and secondarily as flood basalts.

This model of melt extraction from the upper mantle has held up well with subsequent observations. The properties of mantle xenoliths confirm that the geothermal gradient is much lower beneath continents than oceans. The olivine of craton root xenoliths is extremely dry, which would give the roots a very high viscosity. Rhenium–osmium dating of xenoliths indicates that the oldest melting events took place in the early to middle Archean. Significant cratonization continued into the late Archean, accompanied by voluminous mafic magmatism.

However, melt extraction alone cannot explain all the properties of craton roots. Jordan notes in his paper that this mechanism could be effective for constructing craton roots only down to a depth of 200 kilometers (120 mi). The great depths of craton roots required further explanation. The 30 to 40 per cent partial melting of mantle rock at 4 to 10 GPa pressure produces komatiite magma and a solid residue very close in composition to Archean lithospheric mantle. Still, continental shields do not contain enough komatiite to match the expected depletion. Either much of the komatiite never reached the surface, or other processes aided craton root formation. There are many competing hypotheses of how cratons have been formed.

=== Repeated continental collision model ===
Jordan's model suggests that further cratonization resulted from repeated continental collisions. The thickening of the crust associated with these collisions may have been balanced by craton root thickening according to the principle of isostacy. Jordan likens this model to "kneading" of the cratons, allowing low-density material to move up and higher density to move down, creating stable cratonic roots as deep as 400 km (250 mi).

=== Molten plume model ===
A second model suggests that the surface crust was thickened by a rising plume of molten material from the deep mantle. This would have built up a thick layer of depleted mantle underneath the cratons.

=== Subducting ocean slab model ===
A third model suggests that successive slabs of subducting oceanic lithosphere became lodged beneath a proto-craton, underplating the craton with chemically depleted rock.

=== Impact origin model ===
A fourth theory presented in a 2015 publication suggests that the origin of the cratons is similar to crustal plateaus observed on Venus, which may have been created by large asteroid impacts. In this model, large impacts on the Earth's early lithosphere penetrated deep into the mantle and created enormous lava ponds. The paper suggests these lava ponds cooled to form the craton's root.

=== Evidence for each model ===
The chemistry of xenoliths and seismic tomography both favor the two accretional models over the plume model. However, other geochemical evidence favors mantle plumes. Tomography shows two layers in the craton roots beneath North America. One is found at depths shallower than 150 km (93 mi) and may be Archean, while the second is found at depths from 180 to 240 km (110 to 150 mi) and may be younger. The second layer may be a less depleted thermal boundary layer that stagnated against the depleted "lid" formed by the first layer. The impact origin model does not require plumes or accretion; this model is, however, not incompatible with either.

All these proposed mechanisms rely on buoyant, viscous material separating from a denser residue due to mantle flow, and it is possible that more than one mechanism contributed to craton root formation.

== Erosion ==
The long-term erosion of cratons has been labelled the "cratonic regime". It involves processes of pediplanation and etchplanation that lead to the formation of flattish surfaces known as peneplains. While the process of etchplanation is associated to humid climate and pediplanation with arid and semi-arid climate, shifting climate over geological time leads to the formation of so-called polygenetic peneplains of mixed origin. Another result of the longevity of cratons is that they may alternate between periods of high and low relative sea levels. High relative sea level leads to increased oceanicity, while the opposite leads to increased inland conditions.

Many cratons have had subdued topographies since Precambrian times. For example, the Yilgarn craton of Western Australia was flattish already by Middle Proterozoic times and the Baltic Shield had been eroded into a subdued terrain already during the Late Mesoproterozoic when the rapakivi granites intruded.

== See also ==
- List of shields and cratons
- Cratonic sequence
