= Polyptychites =

Polyptychites Temporal range: Early Cretaceous (Valanginian)

Scientific classification
- Kingdom: Animalia
- Phylum: Mollusca
- Class: Cephalopoda
- Subclass: †Ammonoidea
- Order: †Ammonitida
- Family: †Polyptychitidae
- Genus: †Polyptychites; Pavlov, 1892

Polyptichites is the perisphictoidean ammonite genus from the Lower Cretaceous of Russia. The shell is subinvolute and coarsely ribbed; ribs bifurcate or trifurcate mid or low on the flanks and cross over the rounded venter. The umbilicus is relatively small and deep. Outer whorls partially envelop the previous leaving a fairly deeply impressed dorsum.
