= Jules Thurmann =

French-Swiss botanist

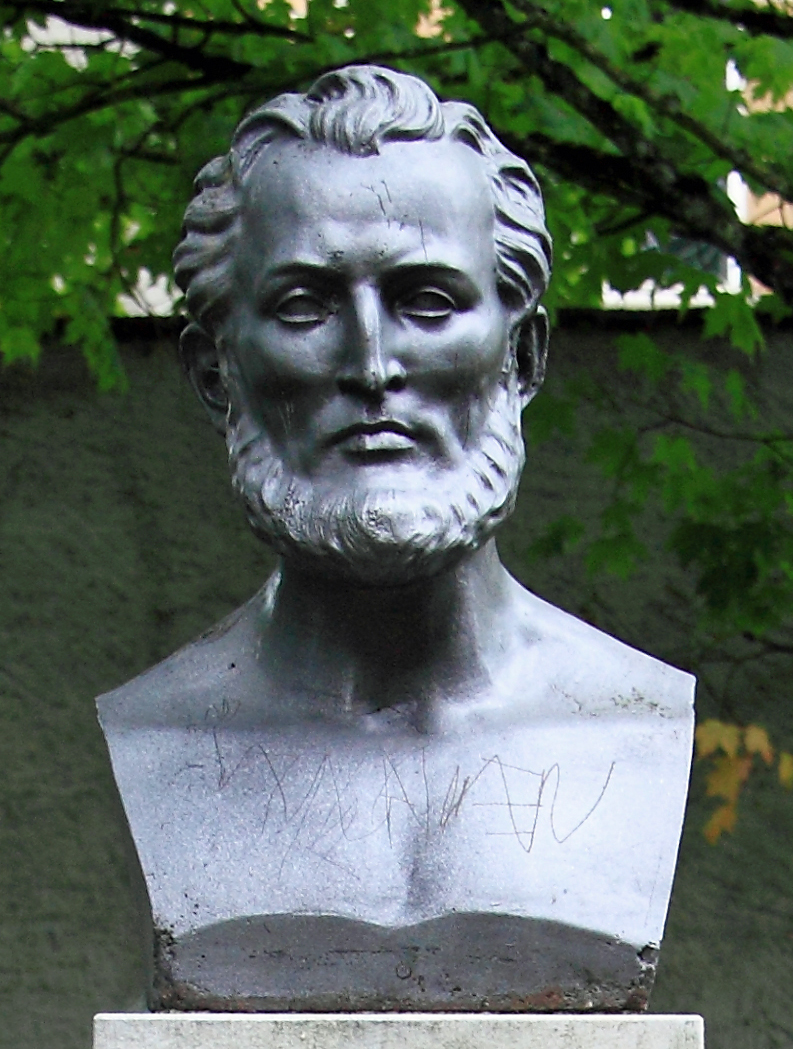
- Born: November 5, 1804
- Died: July 25, 1855 (aged 50)
- Occupations: geologist and botanist
- Known for: Founder of the Société de statistique des districts du Jura (1832); Co-founder and first president of the Société jurassienne d'émulation The distinction between vegetation and flora

Jules Thurmann (5 November 1804, Neuf-Brisach in Haut-Rhin, France – 25 July 1855, Porrentruy) was an Alsatian French-Swiss geologist and botanist.

He studied at the college in Porrentruy, then continued his education at the University of Strasbourg and at the École royale des mines in Paris. In 1832 he was appointed professor of mathematics and natural sciences at Porrentruy College. In 1837 he became the first director of the "normal school" for teachers in Porrentruy. In 1838 he was chairman of the first congress for the Société géologique de France, which took place in Porrentruy.

He devoted much of his time to geological studies of the Jura Mountains, being known for his pioneer investigations in regards to Jurassic orography. In the field of stratigraphy, he introduced in 1834 the term "Neocomian" to define the lowest stage of Cretaceous formation. As a botanist, he conducted phytosociological research, and is credited with directing the last phases of development for the botanical garden at Porrentruy.

He was the founder of the Société de statistique des districts du Jura (1832); co-founder and first president of the Société jurassienne d'émulation (1847–1855) and a member of the Grand Conseil bernois (1837–1839, 1844–1845).

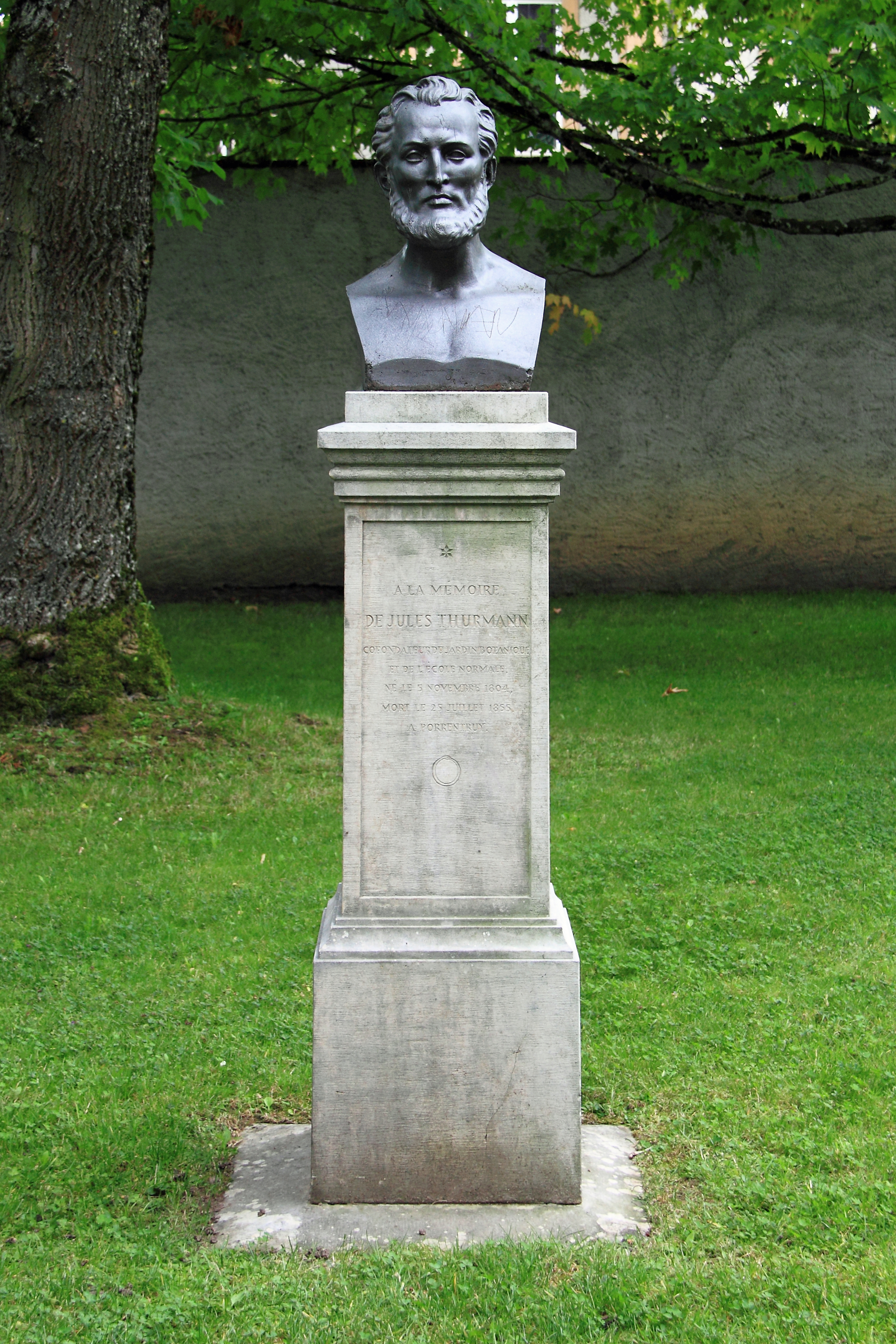
Bust of Jules Thurmann at the Jardin botanique (Porrentruy)

== Published works (selection) ==
- Essai sur les soulèvemens jurassiques du Porrentruy, 1832 – Essay on Jurassic upheavals around Porrentruy.
- Principes de pédagogie, 1842 – Principles of pedagogy.
- Système de géographie botanique, 1847 – System of phytogeography.
- Enumération des plantes vasculaires du district de Porrentruy, 1848 – Enumeration of vascular plants in the district of Porrentruy.
- Essai de Phytostatique appliqué à la chaîne du Jura et aux contrées voisines, 1849 – Essay on applied phytostatics for the Jura chain and neighboring regions.
- Résumé des lois orographiques générales du système des Monts-Jura, 1853 – On general orographic laws involving the Jura Mountains.
