= Lithospheric flexure =

Bending of the earth's rigid outer layer due to geological forces

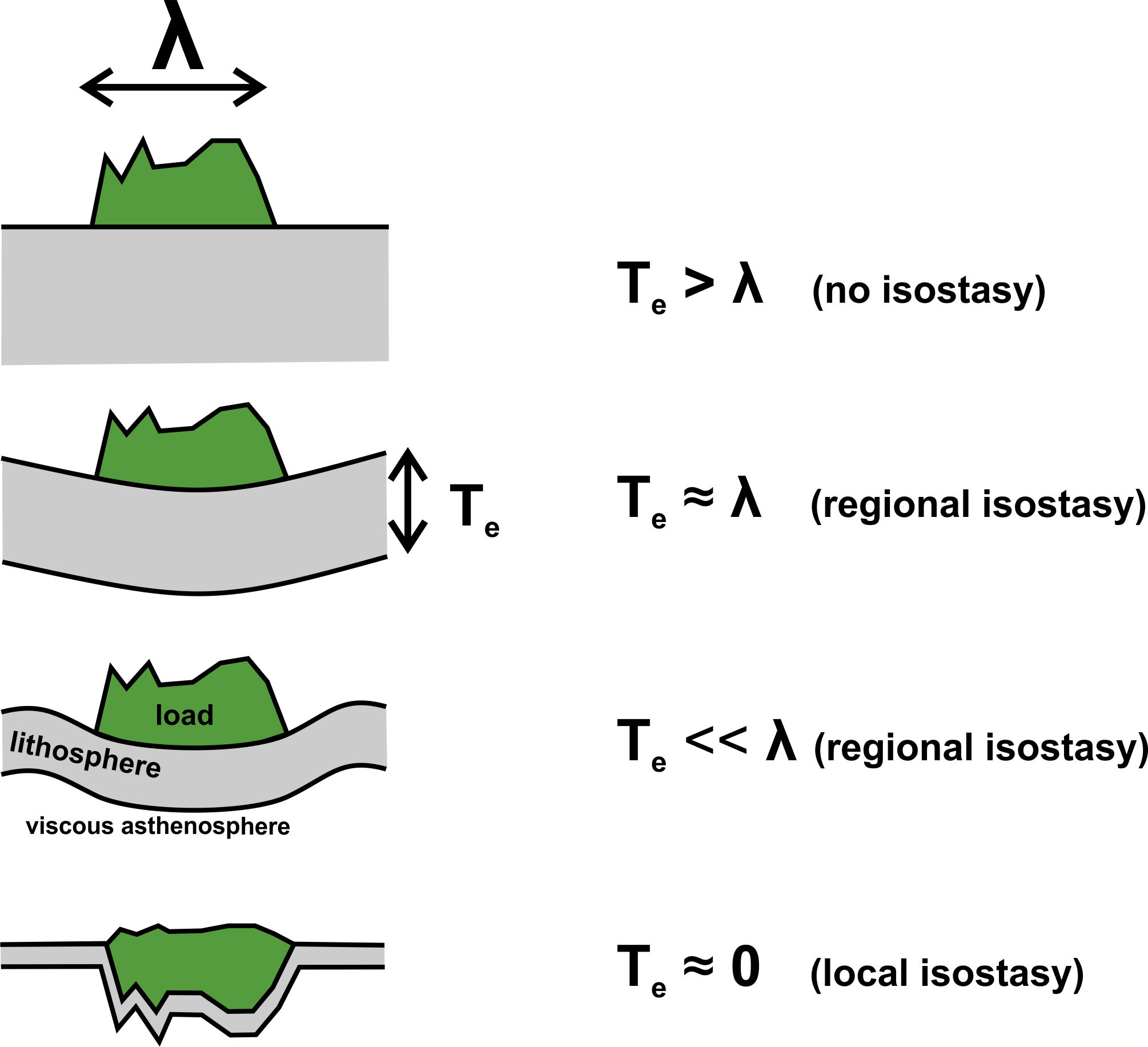
Cartoon showing the isostatic vertical motions of the lithosphere (grey) in response to a vertical load (in green)

In geology, lithospheric flexure (also called regional isostasy) is the process by which the lithosphere (rigid, thin outer layer of the Earth) bends under the action of forces such as the weight of a growing orogeny or changes in ice thickness related to glaciation. The lithosphere rests on the asthenosphere, a viscous layer that in geological time scales behaves like a fluid. Thus, when loaded, the lithosphere progressively reaches an isostatic equilibrium, which represents Archimedes' principle applied to geological settings.

This phenomenon was first described in the late 19th century to explain the shorelines uplifted in Scandinavia by the removal of large ice massed during the last glaciation. American geologist G. K. Gilbert used it to explain the uplifted shorelines of Lake Bonneville. The concept was not retaken until the 1950s by Vening Meinesz.

The geometry of the lithospheric bending is often modeled adopting a pure elastic thin plate approach (sometimes by fitting the gravity anomaly produced by that bending rather than more direct data of it). The thickness of such plate that best fits the observed lithospheric bending is called the equivalent elastic thickness of the lithosphere and is related to the stiffness or rigidity of the lithosphere. These lithospheric bending calculations are typically performed following the Euler-Bernoulli bending formulation, or alternatively the Lagrange equation.
