= Akiho Miyashiro =

Japanese geologist

- 都城秋穂
- Born: 30 October 1920; Okayama Prefecture, Japan
- Died: 22 July 2008 (aged 87); Thacher Park, Albany County, New York, United States
- Citizenship: Japan
- Education: Tokyo Imperial University
- Known for: Ophiolite studies Paired metamorphic belts
- Awards: Arthur L. Day Medal (1977); Japan Academy Prize (2002)
- Scientific career
- Fields: Petrology, tectonics
- Workplaces: University of Tokyo; Columbia University; New York State University

Akiho Miyashiro (都城 秋穂, Miyashiro Akiho; 30 October 1920 – 22 July 2008) was a Japanese geologist.

== Career ==
Miyashiro was known for his contributions to metamorphic and igneous petrology. He also made contributions to the study of tectonics and meteorites. In the 1960s he introduced the concept of paired metamorphic belts. In 1973 Miyashiro challenged the common conceptions of ophiolites and proposed an island arc origin for the famous Troodos Ophiolite in Cyprus. This was done arguing that numerous lavas and dykes in the ophiolite had calc-alkaline chemistries.

== Personal life and death ==
Miyashiro was a native of Okayama Prefecture. On the evening of 22 July 2008, Miyashiro visited John Boyd Thacher State Park in Albany, New York and remained there to take sunset pictures while his wife waited by the parking area. Police discovered his body at the base of a cliff on the 24th.
