= Isostasy =

State of gravitational equilibrium between Earth's crust and mantle

Isostasy (from Greek ísos 'equal' and stásis 'standstill') or isostatic equilibrium is the state of gravitational equilibrium between Earth's crust (or lithosphere) and mantle such that the crust "floats" at an elevation that depends on its thickness and density. This concept is invoked to explain how different topographic heights can exist at Earth's surface. Although originally defined in terms of continental crust and mantle, it has subsequently been interpreted in terms of lithosphere and asthenosphere, particularly with respect to oceanic island volcanoes, such as the Hawaiian Islands.

Although Earth is a dynamic system that responds to loads in many different ways, isostasy describes the important limiting case in which crust and mantle are in static equilibrium. Certain areas (such as the Himalayas and other convergent margins) are not in isostatic equilibrium and are not well described by isostatic models.

The general term isostasy was coined in 1882 by the American geologist Clarence Dutton.

== History of the concept ==
In the 17th and 18th centuries, French geodesists (for example, Jean Picard) attempted to determine the shape of the Earth (the geoid) by measuring the length of a degree of latitude at different latitudes, known as arc measurement. In particular, French geodesist Pierre Bouguer, among others, conducted a scientific mission for this purpose to the Viceroyalty of Peru, more specifically to the Royal Audience of Quito (today's Ecuador), operating under the prevailing scientific assumption of seeing the crust as a "constant and uniform layer", thus expecting measurements of considerable plumb line deflection due to the gravitational attraction of the nearby Andes Mountains, but observing a much smaller deflection in practice. Bouguer's findings, combined with George Everest's 19th-century observations of the Himalayas showed that this was a widespread phenomenon in mountainous areas and resulted in "the notion of isostasy [being] created and introduced." These measurements were later attributed by English mathematician and astronomer George Airy to the mountains having low-density roots that compensated for the mass of the mountains. In other words, the low-density mountain roots provided the buoyancy to support the weight of the mountains above the surrounding terrain. It was later found that the difference between the measured local gravitational field and what was expected for the altitude and local terrain (the Bouguer anomaly) is positive over ocean basins and negative over high continental areas. This shows that the low elevation of ocean basins and high elevation of continents is also compensated at depth.

The American geologist Clarence Dutton coined the term 'isostasy' in 1889 to describe this general phenomenon. However, two hypotheses to explain the phenomenon had by then already been proposed, in 1855, one by Airy and the other by John Henry Pratt. The Airy hypothesis was later refined by the Finnish geodesist Veikko Aleksanteri Heiskanen and the Pratt hypothesis by the American geodesist John Fillmore Hayford.

Both the Airy-Heiskanen and Pratt-Hayford hypotheses assume that isostacy reflects a local hydrostatic balance. A third hypothesis, lithospheric flexure, takes into account the rigidity of the Earth's outer shell, the lithosphere. Lithospheric flexure was first invoked in the late 19th century to explain the shorelines uplifted in Scandinavia following the melting of continental glaciers at the end of the last glaciation. It was likewise used by American geologist G. K. Gilbert to explain the uplifted shorelines of Lake Bonneville. The concept was further developed in the 1950s by the Dutch geodesist Vening Meinesz.

== Models ==
Three principal models of isostasy are used:

1. The Airy–Heiskanen model – where different topographic heights are accommodated by changes in crustal thickness, in which the crust has a constant density
2. The Pratt–Hayford model – where different topographic heights are accommodated by lateral changes in rock density.
3. The Vening Meinesz, or flexural isostasy model – where the lithosphere acts as an elastic plate and its inherent rigidity distributes local topographic loads over a broad region by bending.

Airy and Pratt isostasy are statements of buoyancy, but flexural isostasy is a statement of buoyancy when deflecting a sheet of finite elastic strength. In other words, the Airy and Pratt models are purely hydrostatic, taking no account of material strength, while flexural isostacy takes into account elastic forces from the deformation of the rigid crust. These elastic forces can transmit buoyant forces across a large region of deformation to a more concentrated load.

Perfect isostatic equilibrium is possible only if mantle material is in rest. However, thermal convection is present in the mantle. This introduces viscous forces that are not accounted for the static theory of isostacy. The isostatic anomaly or IA is defined as the Bouguer anomaly minus the gravity anomaly due to the subsurface compensation, and is a measure of the local departure from isostatic equilibrium. At the center of a level plateau, it is approximately equal to the free air anomaly. Models such as deep dynamic isostasy (DDI) include such viscous forces and are applicable to a dynamic mantle and lithosphere. Measurements of the rate of isostatic rebound (the return to isostatic equilibrium following a change in crust loading) provide information on the viscosity of the upper mantle.

=== Airy ===
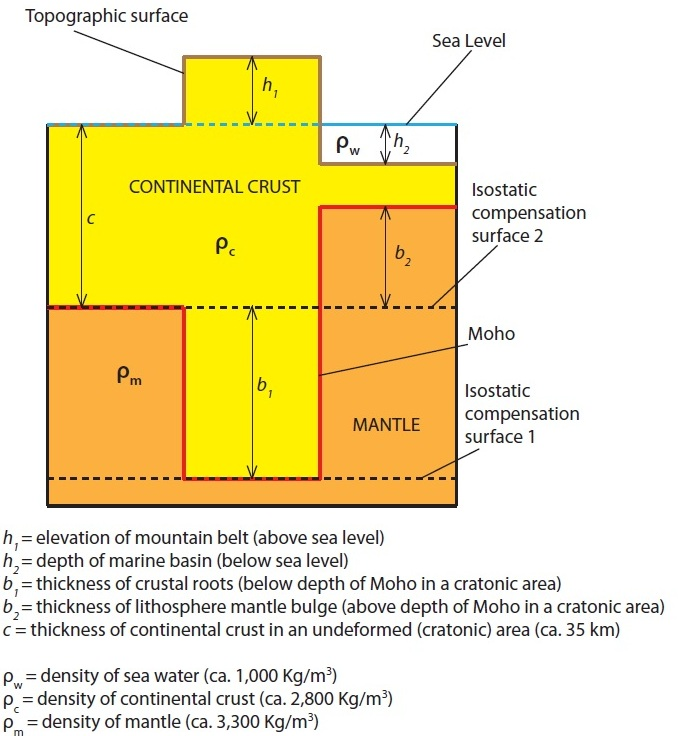
Airy isostasy, in which a constant-density crust floats on a higher-density mantle, and topography is determined by the thickness of the crust.

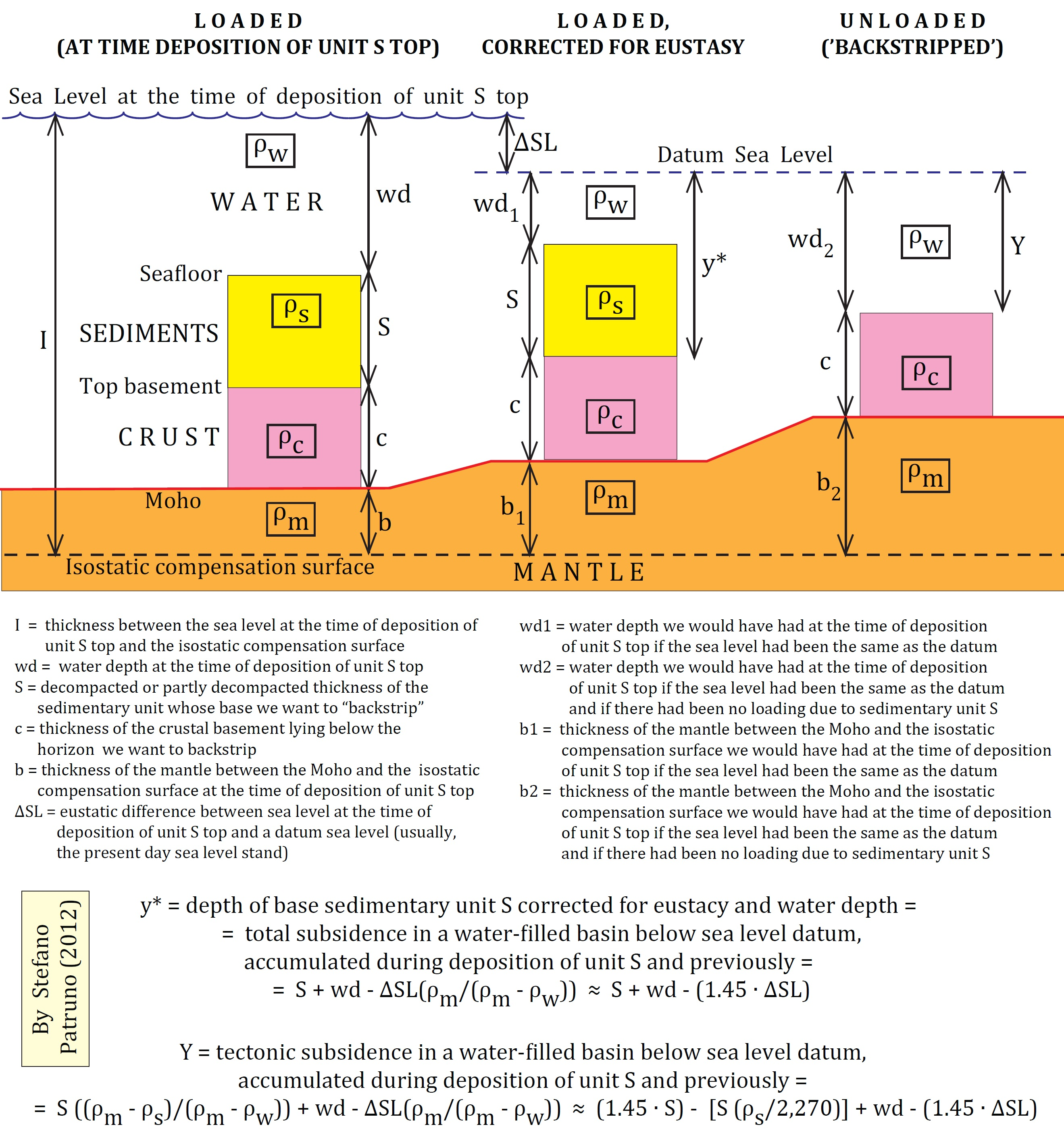
Airy isostasy applied to a real-case basin scenario, where the total load on the mantle is composed by a crustal basement, lower-density sediments and overlying marine water

The basis of the model is Pascal's law, and particularly its consequence that, within a fluid in static equilibrium, the hydrostatic pressure is the same on every point at the same elevation (surface of hydrostatic compensation):

h_{1}⋅ρ_{1} = h_{2}⋅ρ_{2} = h_{3}⋅ρ_{3} = ... h_{n}⋅ρ_{n}

For the simplified picture shown, the depth of the mountain belt roots (b_{1}) is calculated as follows:

$$(h_1+c+b_1)\rho_c = (c\rho_c)+(b_1\rho_m)$$
$${b_1(\rho_m-\rho_c)} = h_1\rho_c$$
$$b_1 = \frac{h_1\rho_c}{\rho_m-\rho_c}$$

where $\rho_m$ is the density of the mantle (ca. 3,300 kg m^{−3}) and $\rho_c$ is the density of the crust (ca. 2,750 kg m^{−3}). Thus, generally:

b_{1} ≅ 5⋅h_{1}

In the case of negative topography (a marine basin), the balancing of lithospheric columns gives:

$$c\rho_c = (h_2\rho_w)+(b_2\rho_m)+[(c-h_2-b_2)\rho_c]$$
$${b_2(\rho_m-\rho_c)} = {h_2(\rho_c-\rho_w)}$$
$$b_2 = (\frac{\rho_c-\rho_w}{\rho_m-\rho_c}){h_2}$$

where $\rho_m$ is the density of the mantle (ca. 3,300 kg m^{−3}), $\rho_c$ is the density of the crust (ca. 2,750 kg m^{−3}) and $\rho_w$ is the density of the water (ca. 1,000 kg m^{−3}). Thus, generally:

b_{2} ≅ 3.2⋅h_{2}

=== Pratt ===
For the simplified model shown the new density is given by: $\rho_1 = \rho_c \frac{c}{h_1+c}$, where $h_1$ is the height of the mountain and c the thickness of the crust.

=== Vening Meinesz / flexural ===
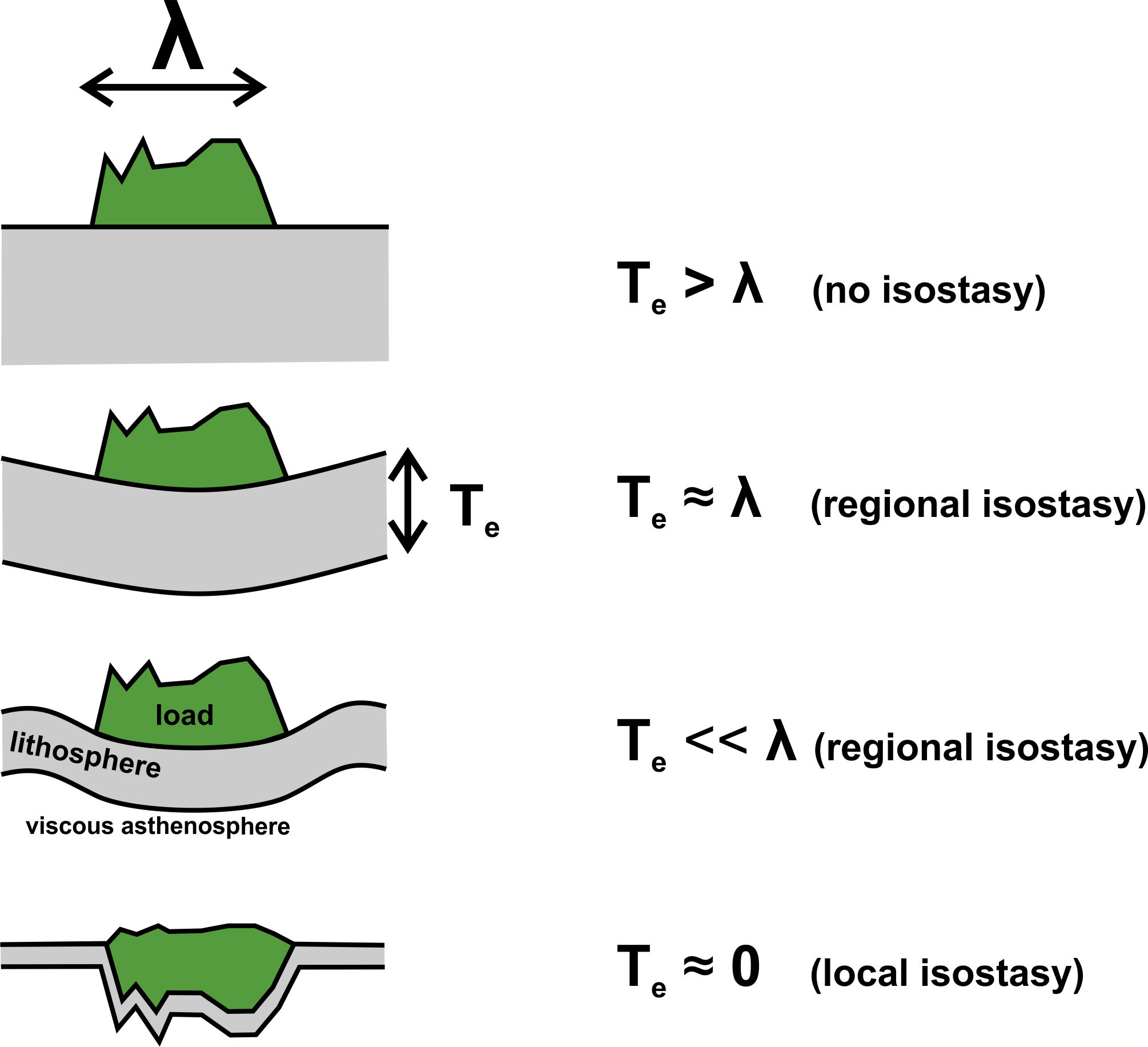
Cartoon showing the isostatic vertical motions of the lithosphere (grey) in response to a vertical load (in green)

This hypothesis was suggested to explain how large topographic loads such as seamounts (e.g. Hawaiian Islands) could be compensated by regional rather than local displacement of the lithosphere. This is the more general solution for lithospheric flexure, as it approaches the locally compensated models above as the load becomes much larger than a flexural wavelength or the flexural rigidity of the lithosphere approaches zero.

For example, the vertical displacement z of a region of ocean crust would be described by the differential equation

$$D\frac{d^4z}{dx^4}+(\rho_m-\rho_w)zg = P(x)$$

where $\rho_m$ and $\rho_w$ are the densities of the aesthenosphere and ocean water, g is the acceleration due to gravity, and $P(x)$ is the load on the ocean crust. The parameter D is the flexural rigidity, defined as

$$D=ET^3_c/12(1-\sigma^2)$$

where E is Young's modulus, $\sigma$ is Poisson's ratio, and $T_c$ is the thickness of the lithosphere. Solutions to this equation have a characteristic wave number

$$\kappa=\sqrt[4]{(\rho_m-\rho_w)g/4D}$$

As the rigid layer becomes weaker, $\kappa$ approaches infinity, and the behavior approaches the pure hydrostatic balance of the Airy-Heiskanen hypothesis.

== Depth of compensation ==
The depth of compensation (also known as the compensation level, compensation depth, or level of compensation) is the depth below which the pressure is identical across any horizontal surface. In stable regions, it lies in the deep crust, but in active regions, it may lie below the base of the lithosphere. In the Pratt model, it is the depth below which all rock has the same density; above this depth, density is lower where topographic elevation is greater.

== Implications ==
=== Deposition and erosion ===
When large amounts of sediment are deposited on a particular region, the immense weight of the new sediment may cause the crust below to sink. Similarly, when large amounts of material are eroded away from a region, the land may rise to compensate. Therefore, as a mountain range is eroded, the (reduced) range rebounds upwards (to a certain extent) to be eroded further. Some of the rock strata now visible at the ground surface may have spent much of their history at great depths below the surface buried under other strata, to be eventually exposed as those other strata eroded away and the lower layers rebounded upwards.

An analogy may be made with an iceberg, which always floats with a certain proportion of its mass below the surface of the water. If snow falls to the top of the iceberg, the iceberg will sink lower in the water. If a layer of ice melts off the top of the iceberg, the remaining iceberg will rise. Similarly, Earth's lithosphere "floats" in the asthenosphere.

=== Continental collisions ===
When continents collide, the continental crust may thicken at their edges in the collision. It is also very common for one of the plates to be underthrust beneath the other plate. The result is that the crust in the collision zone becomes as much as 80 kilometers (50 mi) thick, versus 40 kilometers (25 mi) for average continental crust. As noted above, the Airy hypothesis predicts that the resulting mountain roots will be about five times deeper than the height of the mountains, or 32 km versus 8 km. In other words, most of the thickened crust moves downwards rather than up, just as most of an iceberg is below the surface of the water.

However, convergent plate margins are tectonically highly active, and their surface features are partially supported by dynamic horizontal stresses, so that they are not in complete isostatic equilibrium. These regions show the highest isostatic anomalies on the Earth's surface.

=== Mid-ocean ridges ===
Mid-ocean ridges are explained by the Pratt hypothesis as overlying regions of unusually low density in the upper mantle. This reflects thermal expansion from the higher temperatures present under the ridges.

=== Basin and Range ===
In the Basin and Range Province of western North America, the isostatic anomaly is small except near the Pacific coast, indicating that the region is generally near isostatic equilibrium. However, the depth to the base of the crust does not strongly correlate with the height of the terrain. This provides evidence (via the Pratt hypothesis) that the upper mantle in this region is inhomogeneous, with significant lateral variations in density.

=== Ice sheets ===
The formation of ice sheets can cause Earth's surface to sink. Conversely, isostatic post-glacial rebound is observed in areas once covered by ice sheets that have now melted, such as around the Baltic Sea and Hudson Bay. As the ice retreats, the load on the lithosphere and asthenosphere is reduced and they rebound back towards their equilibrium levels. In this way, it is possible to find former sea cliffs and associated wave-cut platforms hundreds of metres above present-day sea level. The rebound movements are so slow that the uplift caused by the ending of the last glacial period is still continuing.

In addition to the vertical movement of the land and sea, isostatic adjustment of the Earth also involves horizontal movements. It can cause changes in Earth's gravitational field and rotation rate, polar wander, and earthquakes.

=== Lithosphere-asthenosphere boundary ===
The hypothesis of isostasy is often used to determine the position of the lithosphere-asthenosphere boundary (LAB).

== See also ==
- Archimedes' principle – Buoyancy principle in fluid dynamics
- William Bowie (engineer) – American geodetic engineer
- Lau, Gotland – District of the island of Gotland, Sweden
- Marine terrace – Emergent coastal landform
- Gravity anomaly – Difference between ideal and observed gravitational acceleration at a location
- Gravity map
- Timeline of the development of tectonophysics (before 1954)
