= Geology of the Rocky Mountains =

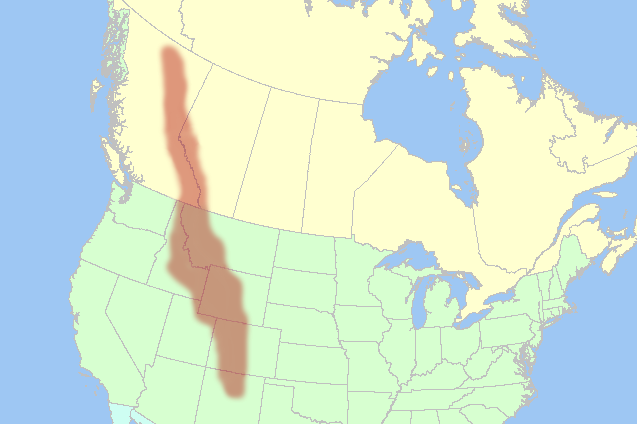
Location of the Rocky Mountains in western North America

The geology of the Rocky Mountains is that of a discontinuous series of mountain ranges with distinct geological origins. Collectively these make up the Rocky Mountains, a mountain system that stretches from Northern British Columbia through central New Mexico and which is part of the great mountain system known as the North American Cordillera.

The rocky cores of the mountain ranges are, in most places, formed of pieces of continental crust that are over one billion years old. In the south, an older mountain range was formed 300 million years ago, then eroded away. The rocks of that older range were reformed into the Rocky Mountains.

The Rocky Mountains took shape during an intense period of plate tectonic activity that resulted in much of the rugged landscape of western North America. The Laramide orogeny, about 80–55 million years ago, was the last of the three episodes and was responsible for raising the Rocky Mountains. Subsequent erosion by glaciers has produced the current form of the mountains.

== Precambrian ==
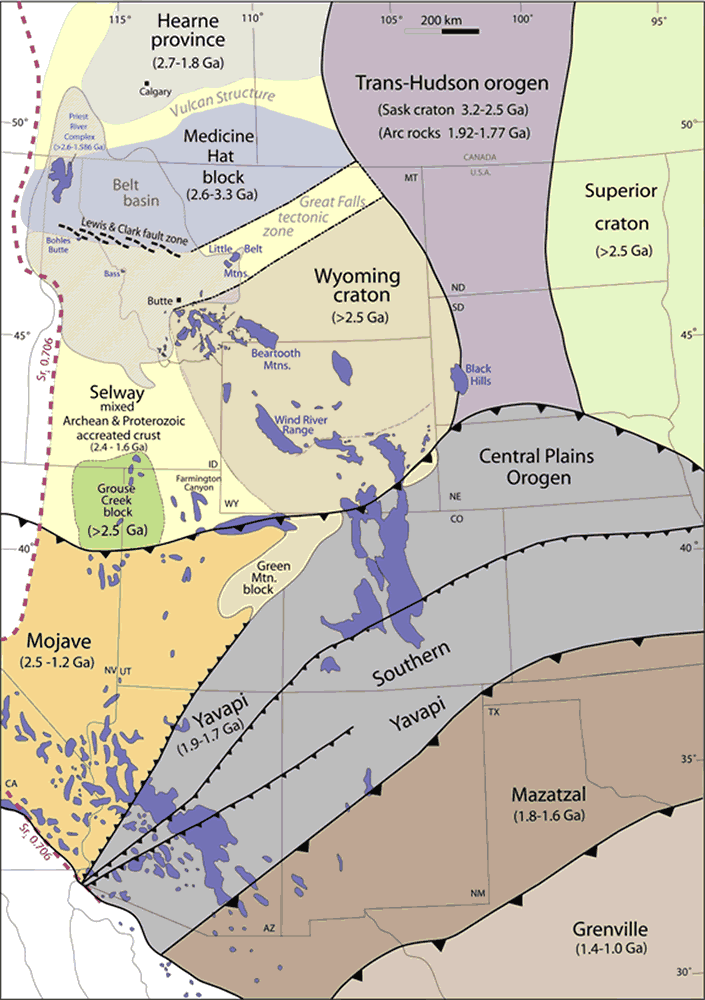
Precambrian cratons and orogens in the Rocky Mountain area

The rocks in the Rocky Mountains were formed before the mountains were raised by tectonic forces. The oldest rock is Precambrian Wyoming craton that forms the core of the North American continent. The Wyoming Craton originated as a 100,000 km^{2} middle Archean craton that was modified by late Archean volcanic magmatism and plate movements and Proterozoic extension and rifting. The Wyoming Craton mainly consists of two rock units: granitoid plutons (2.8–2.55 Ga) and gneiss and migmatite. The granitoid rocks are mainly potassic granite and were derived principally from reworked older (3.1–2.8 Ga) gneiss.

During the Paleoproterozoic, an island-arc terrane associated with the Colorado orogeny accreted to the Wyoming Craton along the Cheyenne belt, a 500-km-wide belt of Proterozoic rocks named for Cheyenne, Wyoming. As a result of the collision, older, Archean rocks of the Wyoming craton were intensely deformed and metamorphosed for at least 75 km inboard from the suture, which is marked today by the Laramie Mountains. The Colorado orogeny was likely part of the larger Yavapai orogeny, which extended across North America and probably to other continents that were joined to North America as part of the supercontinent, Columbia.

In the Paleoproterozoic, terranes also accumulated on the west side of the Wyoming Craton, forming the Selway terrane in Idaho.

Mesoproterozoic (~1.4 Ga) anorthosite and syenites of the Laramie Anorthosite Complex and granite intrude into rocks of the Colorado orogen in the Laramie and adjacent Medicine Bow Mountains. Both the anorthosite and granite transect the Cheyenne belt in the Laramide Mountains, and intrude crystalline rocks of the Wyoming province. These intrusions comprise the northernmost segment of a wide belt of 1.4 Ga granitic intrusions that occur throughout the Colorado orogen.

The breakup of the Rodinia supercontinent produced rifts between 900 million and 600 million years ago in the Neoproterozoic. These deep extensional basement faults filled with sediments, such as the Uinta rift basin and were reactivated more recently in Earth history by orogenies. The Uinta Formation and Uncompahgre Formation are both examples of remnant Precambrian rift basin sediments. The end of the Neoproterozoic is not known from the rock record, indicating a period of long-running terrestrial erosion which produced by the Great Unconformity, from 1.1 billion to 510 million years ago. Twelve to 24 kilometers of basement rock eroded away.

== Ancestral Rocky Mountains ==
During the Paleozoic, western North America lay underneath a shallow sea, which deposited many kilometers of limestone and dolomite.

In the southern Rocky Mountains, near present-day Colorado and New Mexico, the Precambrian and Paleozoic rocks were disturbed by mountain building approximately 300 Ma, during the Pennsylvanian. This mountain building produced the Ancestral Rocky Mountains. The uplift formed two large mountainous islands, known to geologists as Frontrangia and Uncompahgria, located roughly in the current locations of the Front Range and the San Juan Mountains. They consisted largely of Precambrian metamorphic rock, forced upward through layers of the limestone laid down in the shallow sea. The mountains eroded throughout the late Paleozoic and early Mesozoic, leaving extensive deposits of sedimentary rock.

Western Interior Seaway 95 million years ago

Mesozoic deposition in the Rockies occurred in a mix of marine, transitional, and continental environments as local relative sea levels changed. By the close of the Mesozoic, 10,000 to 15,000 feet (3000 to 4500 m) of sediment accumulated in 15 recognized formations. The most extensive non-marine formations were deposited in the Cretaceous period when the western part of the Western Interior Seaway covered the region.

== Mesozoic terranes and subduction ==
Terranes started to collide with the western edge of North America in the Mississippian age (approximately 350 million years ago), causing the Antler orogeny. During the last half of the Mesozoic Era, much of today's California, British Columbia, Oregon, and Washington were added to North America. Western North America suffered the effects of repeated terrane collisions as the Kula and Farallon Plates sank beneath the continental edge. Slivers of continental crust, carried along by subducting ocean plates, were swept into the subduction zone and scraped onto North America's western edge.

These terranes represent a variety of tectonic environments. Some are ancient island arcs, similar to Japan, Indonesia and the Aleutians; others are fragments of oceanic crust obducted onto the continental margin while others represent small isolated mid-oceanic islands.

Sketch of an oceanic plate subducting beneath a continental plate at a collisional plate boundary. The oceanic plate typically sinks at a high angle (exaggerated here). A volcanic arc grows above the subducting plate.

Magma generated above the subducting slab rose into the North American continental crust about 200 to 300 miles (300 to 500 km) inland. Great arc-shaped volcanic mountain ranges, known as the Sierran Arc, grew as lava and ash spewed out of dozens of individual volcanoes. Beneath the surface, great masses of molten rock were injected and hardened in place.

For 270 million years, the effects of plate collisions were focused very near the edge of the North American Plate boundary, far to the west of the Rocky Mountain region. It was not until 80 MA that these effects began to reach the Rockies.

== Raising the Rockies ==
The current Rocky Mountains were raised in the Laramide orogeny from between 80 and 55 Ma. For the Canadian Rockies, the mountain building is analogous to a rug bunching into wrinkles as it is pushed along a smooth floor: the subduction of the Kula plate and the terranes smashing into the continent are the feet pushing the rug, the ancestral continental crust is like the rug, and the Canadian Shield in the middle of the continent is the floor.

Farther south, the growth of the Rocky Mountains in the United States is a geological puzzle. Mountain building is normally focused between 200 and 400 miles (300 and 600 km) inland from a subduction zone boundary. Geologists continue to gather evidence to explain the rise of the Rockies so much farther inland; the answer most likely lies with the unusual subduction of the Farallon plate as it was pushed under North America by the developing mid-ocean Pacific plate, or possibly due to the subduction of an oceanic plateau.

At a typical subduction zone, an oceanic plate sinks at a fairly steep angle, and a volcanic arc grows above the subducting plate. During the growth of the Rocky Mountains, the angle of the subducting Farallon plate may have been significantly flattened, moving the focus of melting and mountain building much farther inland than usual. It is postulated that the shallow angle of the subducting plate greatly increased the friction and other interactions with the thick continental mass above it. Tremendous thrusts piled sheets of crust on top of each other, building the extraordinarily broad, high Rocky Mountain range.

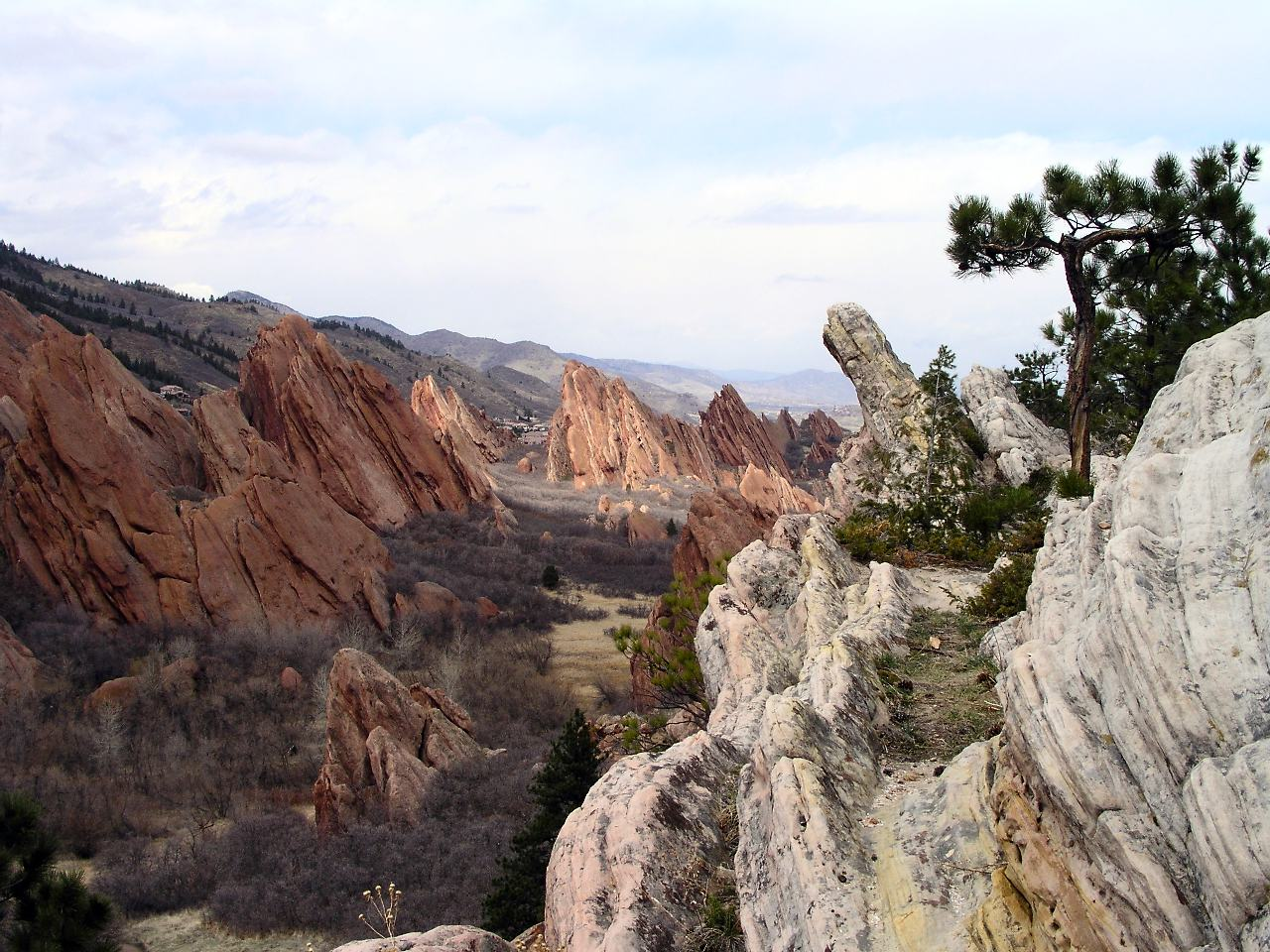
Tilted slabs of sedimentary rock in Colorado

The peaks of the current southern Rockies were forced upwards through the layers of Pennsylvanian and Permian sedimentary remnants of the Ancestral Rocky Mountains. Such sedimentary remnants were often tilted at steep angles along the flanks of the modern range; they are now visible in many places throughout the Rockies, and are prominently shown along the Dakota Hogback, an early Cretaceous sandstone formation that runs along the eastern flank of the modern Rockies.

== Current landscape ==
Immediately after the Laramide orogeny, the Rockies were like Tibet: a high plateau, probably 6,000 metres (20,000 ft) above sea level. In the last 60 million years, erosion stripped away the high rocks, revealing the ancestral rocks beneath, and forming the current landscape of the Rockies.

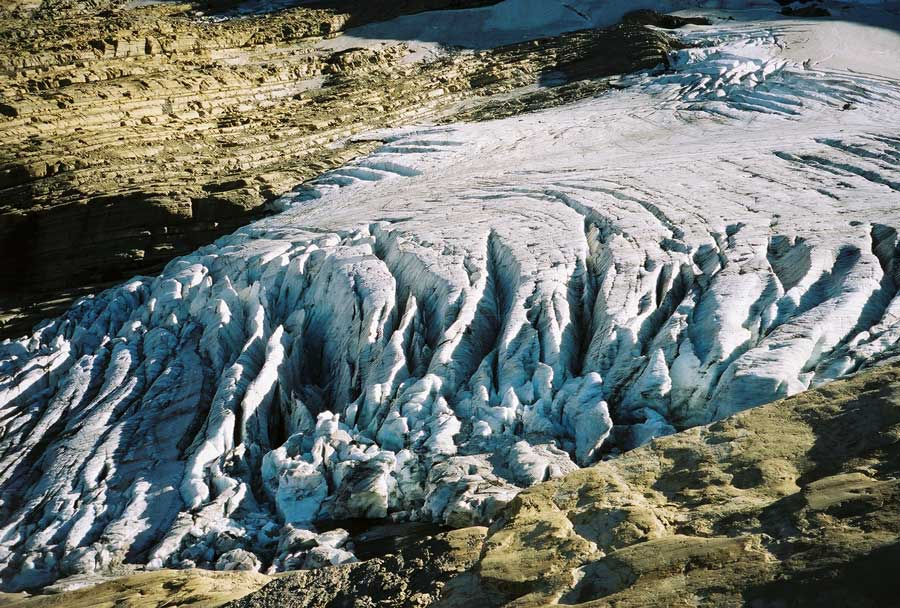
Glaciers, such as Jackson Glacier as shown here, have dramatically shaped the Rocky Mountains.

Multiple periods of glaciation occurred during the Pleistocene Epoch (1.8 million–12,000 years ago), finally receding in the Holocene Epoch (from 11,000 years ago). These ice ages left their mark on the Rockies, forming extensive glacial landforms, such as U-shaped valleys and cirques. Recent glacial episodes included the Bull Lake Glaciation that began about 150,000 years ago and the Pinedale Glaciation that probably remained at full glaciation until 15,000–20,000 years ago. Ninety percent of Yellowstone National Park was covered by ice during the Pinedale Glaciation. Glaciers again advanced during the Little Ice Age from about 1550 to 1860: for example, the Agassiz and Jackson Glaciers in Glacier National Park reached their maximum about 1860.

All of these geological processes have left a complex set of rocks exposed at the surface. For example, in the Rockies of Colorado, there is extensive granite and gneiss dating back to the Ancestral Rockies. In the central Canadian Rockies, the main ranges are composed of the Precambrian mudstones, while the front ranges are composed of the Paleozoic limestones and dolomites. Volcanic rock from the Cenozoic (66 million–1.8 million years ago) occurs in the San Juan Mountains and in other areas. Millennia of severe erosion in the Wyoming Basin transformed intermountain basins into a relatively flat terrain. The Tetons and other north-central ranges contain folded and faulted rocks of Paleozoic and Mesozoic age draped above cores of Proterozoic and Archean igneous and metamorphic rocks ranging in age from 1.2 billion (e.g., Tetons) to more than 3.3 billion years (Beartooth Mountains).

== See also ==
- Aspen anomaly
- Canadian Rockies
- Geology of the Grand Teton area
- Sierra Nevada
