= Aspen, Colorado =

Home rule city in Pitkin County, Colorado, United States

- Home rule city
- City of Aspen
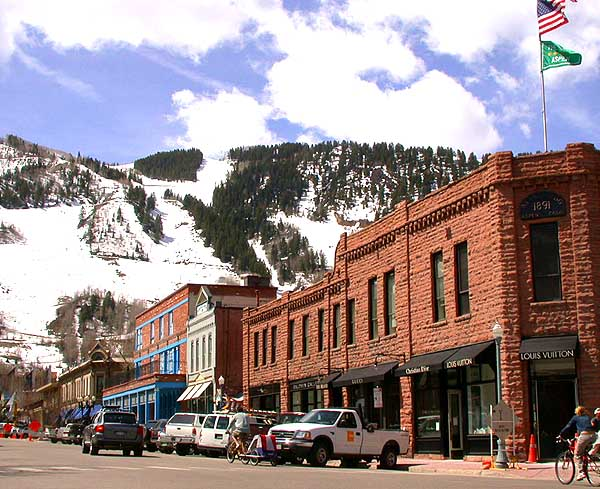
- Downtown Aspen (April 2005)

- Flag Logo

- Location within Pitkin County and Colorado
- Coordinates: 39°11′42″N 106°50′12″W
- Country: United States
- State: Colorado
- County: Pitkin
- Settled: 1879
- Incorporation: 1881
- Named for: Aspen trees around the city

Government
  - Type: Council–manager

Area
  - Total: 3.858 sq mi (9.992 km^{2})
  - Land: 3.858 sq mi (9.992 km^{2})
  - Water: 0 sq mi (0.000 km^{2})
- Elevation: 8,000 ft (2,400 m)

Population (2020)
  - Total: 7,004
  - Density: 1,815/sq mi (701/km^{2})
- Time zone: UTC−07:00 (MST)
  - Summer (DST): UTC−06:00 (MDT)
- ZIP Code: 81611, 81612 (PO Boxes)
- Area code: 970
- GNIS town ID: 2409743
- FIPS code: 08-03620
- Website: aspen.gov

Aspen is the home rule city that is the county seat of, and the most populous municipality in, Pitkin County, Colorado, United States. The city population was 7,004 at the 2020 United States census. Aspen is in a remote area of the Rocky Mountains' Sawatch Range and Elk Mountains, along the Roaring Fork River at an elevation just below 8,000 feet (2,400 m) on the Western Slope, 11 miles (18 km) west of the Continental Divide. Aspen is now a part of the Rifle, CO Micropolitan Statistical Area.

Founded as a mining camp during the Colorado Silver Boom and later named Aspen for the abundance of aspen trees in the area, the city boomed during the 1880s, its first decade. The boom ended when the Panic of 1893 led to a collapse of the silver market. For the next half-century, known as "the quiet years", the population steadily declined, reaching a nadir of fewer than 1000 by 1930. Aspen's fortunes recovered in the mid-20th century when neighboring Aspen Mountain was developed into a ski resort, and industrialist Walter Paepcke bought many properties in the city in the 1950s and redeveloped them. Today it is home to three institutions, two of which Paepcke helped found, having international importance: the Aspen Music Festival and School, the Aspen Institute, and the Aspen Center for Physics.

In the late 20th century, the town became a popular retreat for celebrities. Gonzo journalist Hunter S. Thompson worked out of a downtown hotel and ran unsuccessfully for county sheriff. Singer John Denver wrote two songs about Aspen after settling there. Both figures popularized Aspen among the counter-cultural youth of the 1970s as an ideal place to live, and the city continued to grow even as it gained notoriety for some of the era's hedonistic excesses (particularly its drug culture).

Aspen remains popular as a year-round destination for locals, multiple-home buyers and tourists. Outdoor recreation in the surrounding White River National Forest serves as a summertime counterpart to the city's four ski areas. Prime residential real estate in Aspen is the most expensive of any ski resort in the world on a per-square-foot basis, according to a study of 44 global ski resorts. Aspen is the world's second-highest-rated ski resort in terms of "the quality and reliability of their conditions and their capacity to withstand climate change."

== History ==
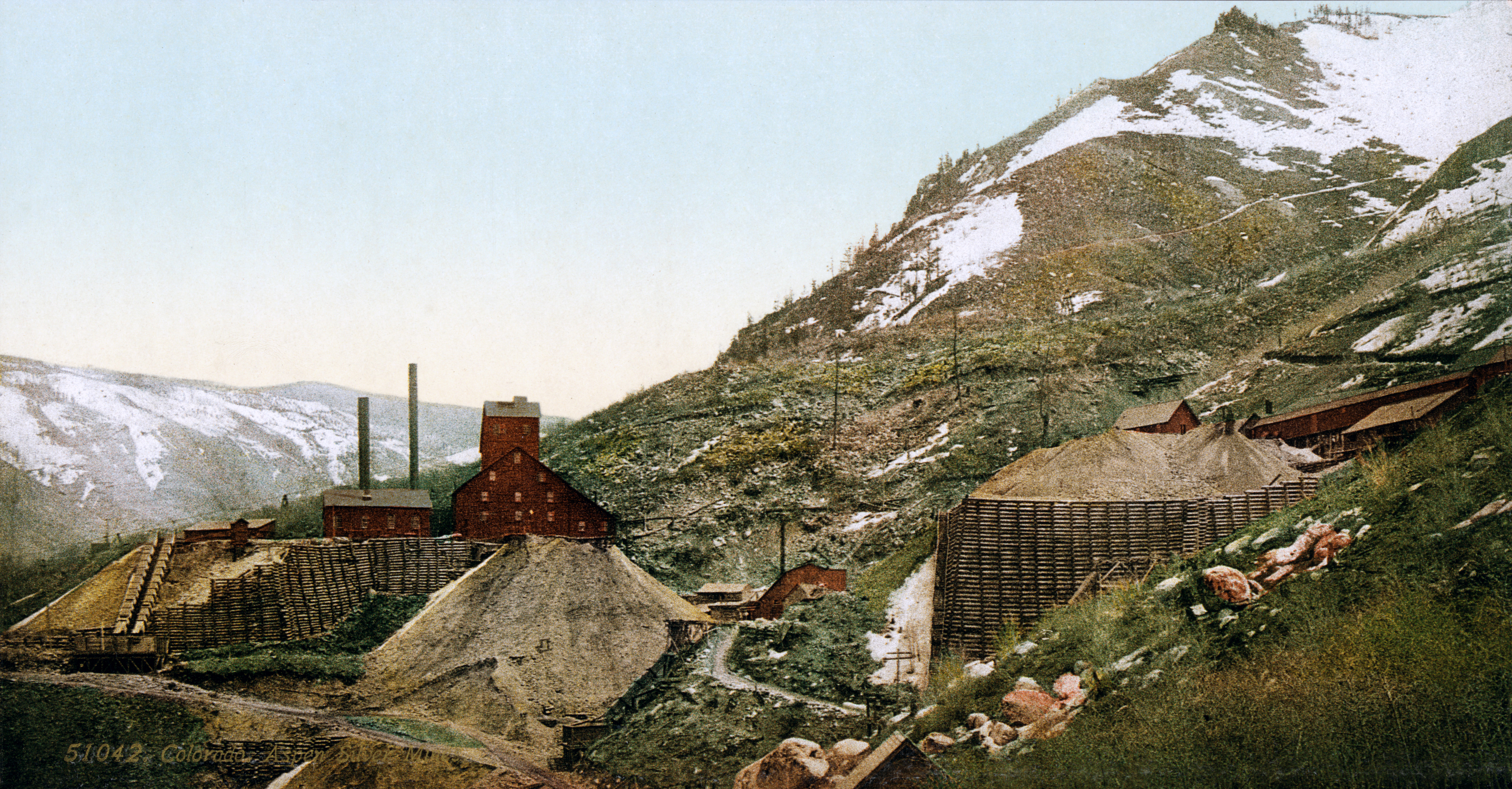
Silver mines in Aspen (1898)

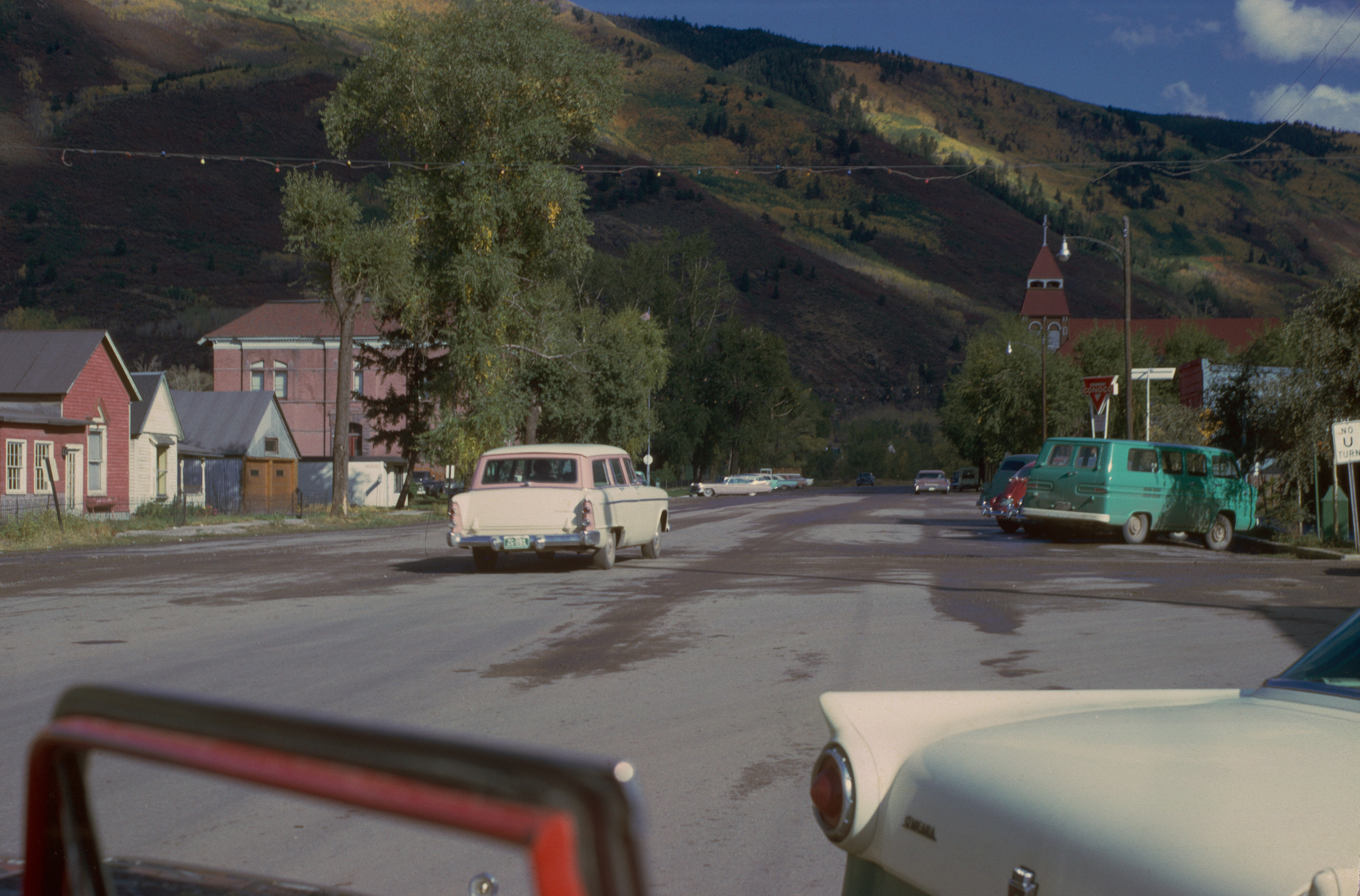
Aspen (1962)

The city originated in 1879 when a group of miners ignored pleas by Frederick Pitkin, Governor of Colorado, to return across the Continental Divide to avoid a Ute uprising. The Utes were fighting to maintain possession of their land and communities. Originally named Ute City, the small community was renamed Aspen. The Aspen, Colorado, post office opened on June 7, 1880. Pitkin County was created on February 23, 1881, with Aspen as its first and only seat. The Town of Aspen was incorporated on April 1, 1881. In its peak production years of 1891 and 1892, Aspen surpassed Leadville as the United States' most productive silver-mining district. Production expanded due to the passage of the Sherman Silver Purchase Act of 1890, which doubled the government's purchase of silver. In 1883, the Apostolic Vicarate of Colorado's Bishop Machebeuf had the Reverend Edward Downey establish the first Catholic mission in Aspen.

By 1893, Aspen had banks, a hospital, a police department, two theaters, an opera house, and electric lights. Economic collapse came with the Panic of 1893, when President Cleveland called a special session of Congress and repealed the act. Within weeks, many of the Aspen mines were closed and thousands of miners were put out of work. It was proposed that silver be recognized as legal tender and the People's Party (populists) adopted that as one of its main issues. Davis H. Waite, an Aspen newspaperman and agitator, was elected governor of Colorado on the Democratic ticket, but in time the movement failed.

== Railroads ==
During the silver boom of the 1880s, two railroads raced to reach Aspen: the Colorado Midland, advancing westward from Leadville, and the Denver and Rio Grande, approaching from Glenwood Springs.

By mid-October 1886, the Colorado Midland had extended its track to Aspen Junction (present-day Basalt) — located at the confluence of the Roaring Fork and Frying Pan rivers—approximately 20 miles from Aspen. In the same week, the Denver and Rio Grande completed its line into Aspen, becoming the first railroad to provide direct rail service to the town.

The Colorado Midland continued construction toward Aspen, with track reaching Maroon Creek by December 1887. Progress was slowed by delays in the construction of a steel viaduct (Maroon Creek Bridge), caused by late delivery of steel, which postponed the arrival of Midland trains into the town.

Despite these setbacks, the Colorado Midland ultimately completed the line, and in early February 1888, the first Midland train arrived in Aspen.

Passenger train service into Aspen permanently ceased on February 24, 1948. In August 1968, freight train service into Aspen ceased.

== Ski resort and cultural development ==
Eventually, after wage cuts, mining revived somewhat, but production declined and by the 1930 census only 705 residents remained.

Aspen's development as a ski resort began in the 1930s when investors conceived of a ski area, but the project was interrupted by World War II. Friedl Pfeifer, a member of the 10th Mountain Division who had trained in the area, returned to the area and linked up with industrialist Walter Paepcke and his wife Elizabeth. The Aspen Skiing Company was founded in 1946 and the city quickly became a well-known resort, hosting the FIS World Championships in 1950. Paepcke also played an important role in bringing the Goethe Bicentennial Convocation to Aspen in 1949, an event held in a newly designed tent by the architect Eero Saarinen. Aspen was then on the path to becoming an internationally known ski resort and cultural center, home of the Aspen Music Festival and School. The area would continue to grow with the development of three additional ski areas, Buttermilk (1958), Aspen Highlands (1958), and Snowmass (1967).

In the 1970s, Aspen became known as a playground for the rich and famous. Notable celebrities frequented the town and ski slopes, also John Denver was one of the more famous permanent residents. In 1978, Aspen was thoroughly photographed for the Aspen Movie Map project funded by the U.S. Department of Defense. The Movie Map is one of the earliest examples of virtual reality software.

In 1999, the city council passed a resolution to petition the US Congress and President Clinton to restrict US immigration. Aspen residents cited concerns about the environmental impacts of increased immigration on their community, including urban and suburban sprawl, pollution from the older automobiles typically driven by immigrants, and litter accumulating in the mountains attributable to the increasing population. The impetus for the resolution was the increasing number of trailer parks that housed the migrant workers employed locally in the service sector and ski industry. The parks were perceived to be degrading to the town's image, property values, and environment. The move was led by Terry Paulson, an Aspen City Council member, and supported and guided by national groups such as the Carrying Capacity Network, and the Center for Immigration Studies. The resolution was discussed on the American Patrol Report website, contributing to a controversy over whether or not the resolution was racially motivated. Councilman Terry Paulson and some Aspen citizens insisted that it was motivated entirely by environmental concerns.

Aspen is notable as the smallest radio market tracked by Arbitron, ranked number 302.

Local media in Aspen include a public radio station, KJAX, a public television station, the Grassroots TV network; three commercial radio stations, KSNO, KTND, and KSPN; two daily newspapers, The Aspen Times and The Aspen Daily News; three local lifestyle magazines, Aspen Sojourner, Aspen Magazine and the biannual Peak, with an expanded statewide focus; and a local, live, commercial lifestyle television channel, Aspen 82.

=== Image ===
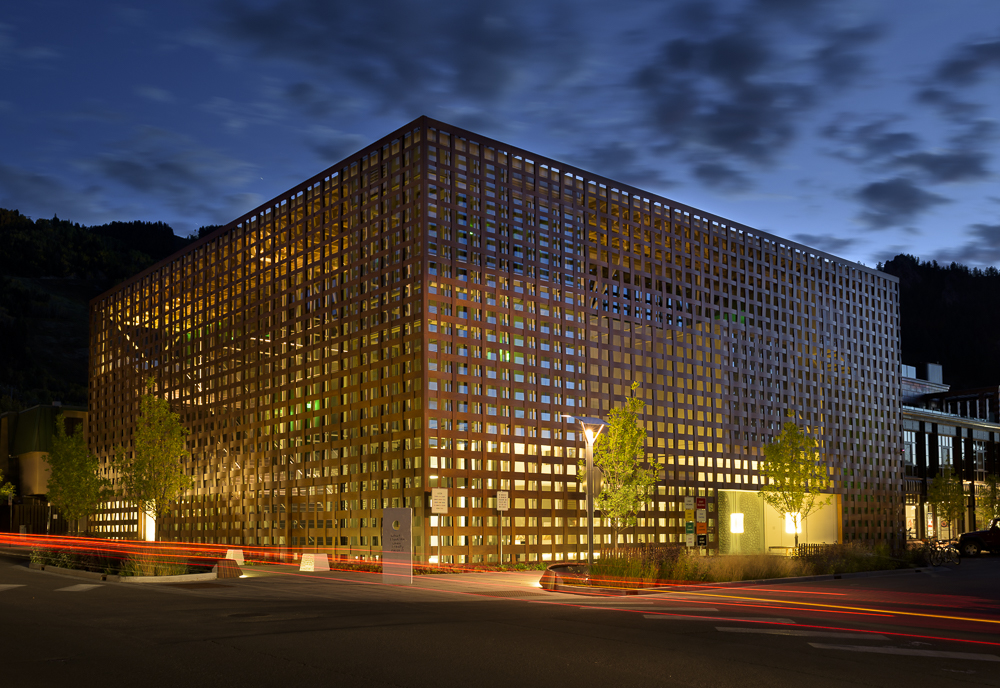
Aspen Art Museum (2015)

The city's character has transformed dramatically in recent decades by skyrocketing property values and the proliferation of second homes, increasingly shutting low- and middle-income workers out of the city and creating a large pool of commuters from nearby bedroom communities such as Snowmass, Basalt, Carbondale, and Glenwood Springs. At the same time, in stark contrast to its historic character, the city has emerged into international fame as a glitzy playground of the wealthy and famous. Aspen has become a second and third home to many international jet-setters. Many people from the U.S. and abroad vacation in Aspen, especially during the winter.

The downtown has been largely transformed into an upscale shopping district that includes high-end restaurants, salons, and boutiques. Stores such as Gucci, Prada and Fendi dot South Mill Street and act as a "Rodeo Drive" of Aspen.

== Geography ==
The city sits along the southeast (upper) end of the Roaring Fork Valley, along the Roaring Fork River, a tributary of the Colorado River about 40 miles (64 km) south of Glenwood Springs, Colorado. It is surrounded by mountain and wilderness areas on three sides: Red Mountain to the north, Smuggler Mountain to the east, and Aspen Mountain to the south.

Aspen is located along State Highway 82.

At the 2020 United States census, the city had a total area of 2,469 acres (9.992 km^{2}), all of it land.

=== Climate ===
Under the Köppen climate classification, Aspen has a humid continental climate (Köppen: Dfb). It has a large diurnal temperature variation with moderately warm summer days very cold winter nights. Summer lows and winter highs are relatively moderate, and frosts are rare in summer and winter days often averaging above freezing.

Climate data for Aspen, Colorado, 1991–2020 normals, extremes 1980–present
Month	Jan	Feb	Mar	Apr	May	Jun	Jul	Aug	Sep	Oct	Nov	Dec	Year
Record high °F (°C)	58 (14)	60 (16)	68 (20)	74 (23)	86 (30)	88 (31)	91 (33)	88 (31)	86 (30)	78 (26)	70 (21)	62 (17)	91 (33)
Mean maximum °F (°C)	48.6 (9.2)	51.7 (10.9)	59.4 (15.2)	67.3 (19.6)	76.1 (24.5)	82.8 (28.2)	85.4 (29.7)	83.4 (28.6)	79.5 (26.4)	72.9 (22.7)	60.6 (15.9)	50.2 (10.1)	85.8 (29.9)
Mean daily maximum °F (°C)	32.0 (0.0)	35.3 (1.8)	42.7 (5.9)	49.7 (9.8)	60.0 (15.6)	70.6 (21.4)	75.5 (24.2)	73.1 (22.8)	66.9 (19.4)	55.2 (12.9)	41.6 (5.3)	31.9 (−0.1)	52.9 (11.6)
Daily mean °F (°C)	20.9 (−6.2)	23.9 (−4.5)	31.2 (−0.4)	38.1 (3.4)	47.5 (8.6)	56.4 (13.6)	61.8 (16.6)	60.1 (15.6)	53.4 (11.9)	42.5 (5.8)	30.5 (−0.8)	21.1 (−6.1)	40.6 (4.8)
Mean daily minimum °F (°C)	9.9 (−12.3)	12.5 (−10.8)	19.8 (−6.8)	26.6 (−3.0)	35.0 (1.7)	42.2 (5.7)	48.1 (8.9)	47.1 (8.4)	40.0 (4.4)	29.8 (−1.2)	19.4 (−7.0)	10.3 (−12.1)	28.4 (−2.0)
Mean minimum °F (°C)	−6.4 (−21.3)	−4.5 (−20.3)	2.7 (−16.3)	12.3 (−10.9)	22.6 (−5.2)	31.2 (−0.4)	40.2 (4.6)	39.5 (4.2)	28.1 (−2.2)	13.1 (−10.5)	1.3 (−17.1)	−7.7 (−22.1)	−10.9 (−23.8)
Record low °F (°C)	−20 (−29)	−25 (−32)	−14 (−26)	0 (−18)	15 (−9)	20 (−7)	29 (−2)	29 (−2)	18 (−8)	−5 (−21)	−13 (−25)	−23 (−31)	−25 (−32)
Average precipitation inches (mm)	1.93 (49)	2.23 (57)	2.59 (66)	2.68 (68)	2.17 (55)	1.06 (27)	1.97 (50)	1.75 (44)	1.89 (48)	2.09 (53)	2.09 (53)	2.00 (51)	24.45 (621)
Average snowfall inches (cm)	28.1 (71)	28.3 (72)	26.9 (68)	20.9 (53)	7.0 (18)	0.4 (1.0)	0.0 (0.0)	0.0 (0.0)	1.0 (2.5)	10.2 (26)	20.5 (52)	27.5 (70)	170.8 (433.5)
Average extreme snow depth inches (cm)	29.1 (74)	36.5 (93)	35.3 (90)	21.2 (54)	4.2 (11)	0.2 (0.51)	0.0 (0.0)	0.0 (0.0)	0.5 (1.3)	5.0 (13)	11.3 (29)	19.2 (49)	39.0 (99)
Average precipitation days (≥ 0.01 in)	12.7	12.7	11.3	13.0	11.0	6.9	11.3	12.5	10.0	9.4	9.9	12.2	132.9
Average snowy days (≥ 0.1 in)	12.0	11.6	9.5	8.4	2.5	0.2	0.0	0.0	0.7	4.0	8.3	11.3	68.5
Average relative humidity (%)	62.9	60.0	54.1	50.1	46.9	42.8	47.4	52.3	50.6	52.3	59.7	64.5	53.6
Mean daily sunshine hours	7	8	8	9	10	11	10	9	9	8	6	6	8
Average ultraviolet index	2	4	6	8	10	11	11	10	8	5	3	2	7
Source: NOAA Weatherbase (humidity) Weather Atlas (daily sunshine hours and UV index)

== Demographics ==
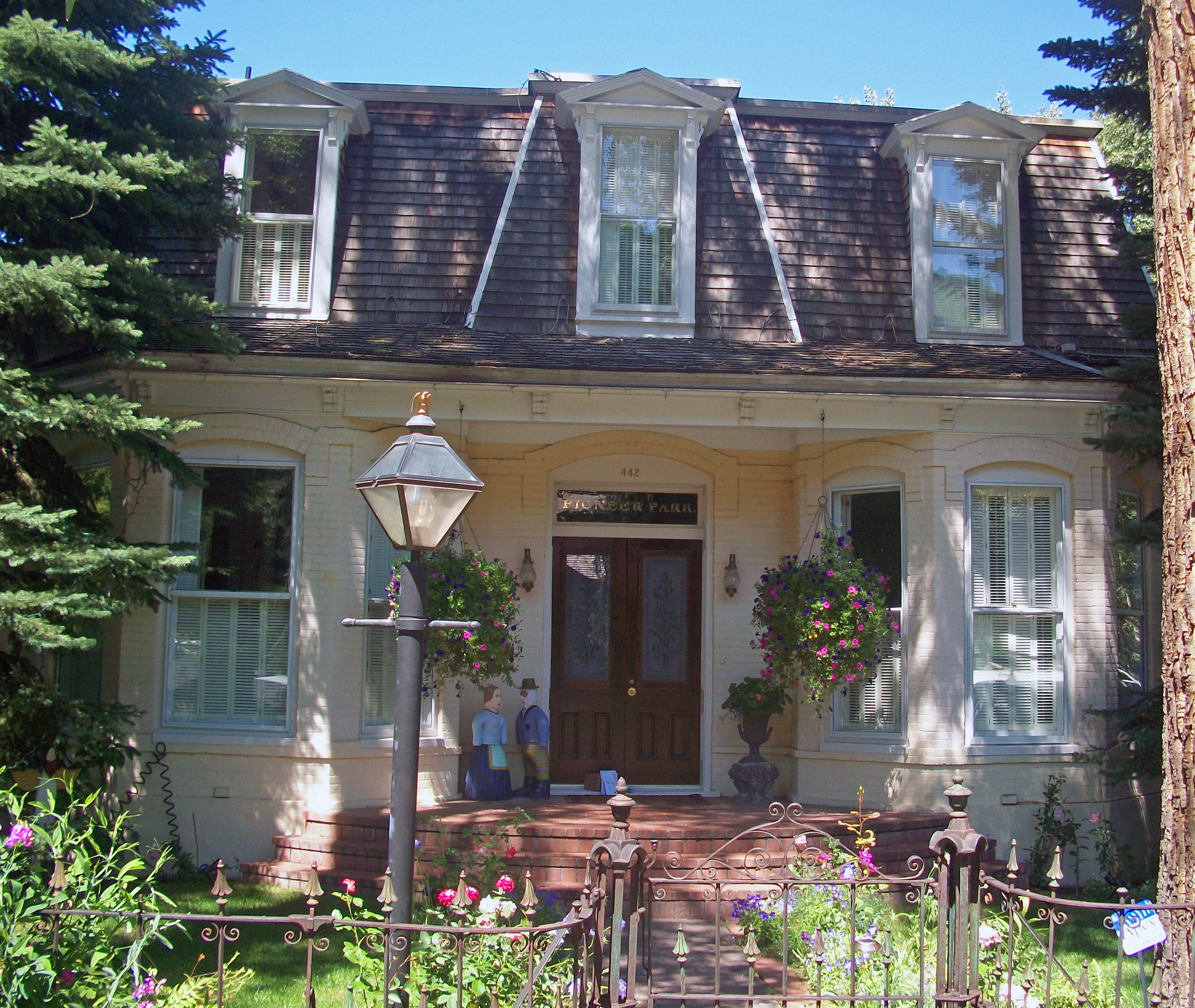
Henry Webber House (2010)

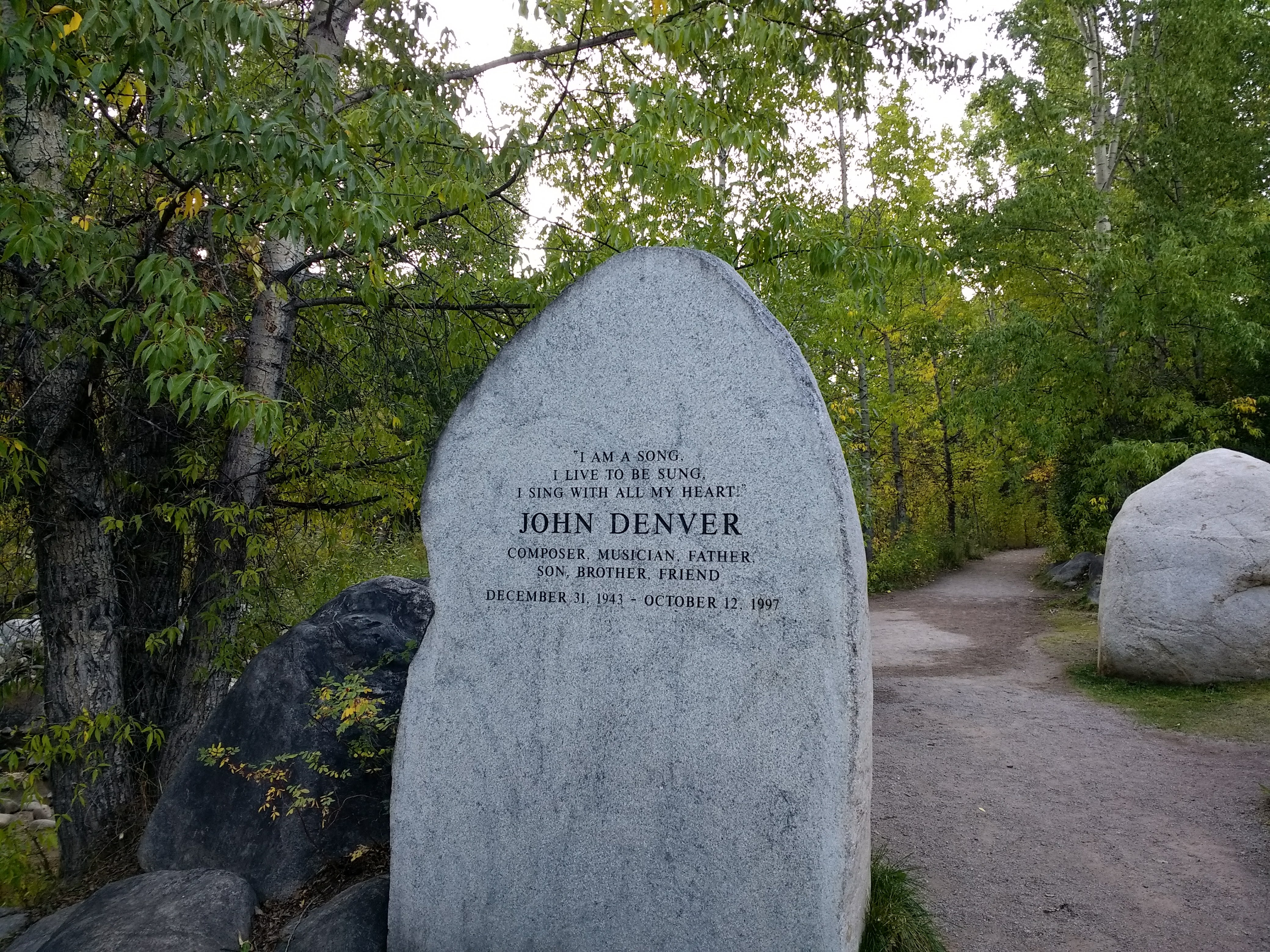
The John Denver Sanctuary in Rio Grande Park

Historical population
Census	Pop.	Note	%±
1890	5,108		—
1900	3,303		−35.3%
1910	1,834		−44.5%
1920	1,265		−31.0%
1930	705		−44.3%
1940	777		10.2%
1950	916		17.9%
1960	1,101		20.2%
1970	2,437		121.3%
1980	3,678		50.9%
1990	5,049		37.3%
2000	5,914		17.1%
2010	6,658		12.6%
2020	7,004		5.2%
U.S. Decennial Census

=== 2020 census ===
As of the 2020 census, Aspen had a population of 7,004. The median age was 41.7 years. 14.6% of residents were under the age of 18 and 16.3% of residents were 65 years of age or older. For every 100 females there were 102.4 males, and for every 100 females age 18 and over there were 103.6 males age 18 and over.

99.8% of residents lived in urban areas, while 0.2% lived in rural areas.

There were 3,540 households in Aspen, of which 19.3% had children under the age of 18 living in them. Of all households, 31.7% were married-couple households, 29.6% were households with a male householder and no spouse or partner present, and 31.4% were households with a female householder and no spouse or partner present. About 43.0% of all households were made up of individuals and 11.7% had someone living alone who was 65 years of age or older.

There were 6,197 housing units, of which 42.9% were vacant. The homeowner vacancy rate was 1.6% and the rental vacancy rate was 13.8%.

Racial composition as of the 2020 census
Race	Number	Percent
White	5,923	84.6%
Black or African American	55	0.8%
American Indian and Alaska Native	20	0.3%
Asian	166	2.4%
Native Hawaiian and Other Pacific Islander	8	0.1%
Some other race	340	4.9%
Two or more races	492	7.0%
Hispanic or Latino (of any race)	766	10.9%

=== 2000 census ===
As of the 2000 census, there were 5,914 people, 2,903 households, and 1,082 families residing in the city. The population density was 1,675.4 inhabitants per square mile (646.9/km^{2}). There were 4,354 housing units at an average density of 1,233.5 per square mile (476.2 per km^{2}). The racial makeup of the city was 94.94 percent White, 0.44 percent Black or African American, 0.24 percent Native American, 1.45 percent Asian, 0.08 percent Pacific Islander, 1.64 percent from other races, and 1.2 percent from two or more races. Hispanic or Latino of any race were 6.14 percent of the population.

There were 2,903 households, of which 16.5 percent had children under the age of 18 living with them, 28.8 percent were married couples living together, 5.6 percent had a female householder with no husband present, and 62.7 percent were non-families. Single individuals composed 43.8 percent of all households, and 4.8 percent had someone living alone who was 65 years of age or older. The average household size was 1.94 and the average family size was 2.67.

The ages of the population were 13.1 percent under the age of 18, 9.8 percent from 18 to 24, 42.1 percent from 25 to 44, 27.6 percent from 45 to 64, and 7.4 percent who were 65 years of age or older. The median age was 37 years. For every 100 females, there were 115.1 males. For every 100 females age 18 and over, there were 117.5 males.

The median income for a household in the city was $53,750, and the median income for a family was $70,300. Males had a median income of $41,011 versus $32,023 for females. The per capita income for the city was $40,680. About 3.6 percent of families and 8.2 percent of the population were below the poverty line, including 4.4 percent of those under age 18 and 2.6 percent of those age 65 or over.

=== Housing ===
Aspen's single-family home prices are among the highest of any town in the country. Real estate supply is restricted due to a moratorium on new housing construction, housing renovation and short-term rentals. The median sales price of a single family home in 2021 in Aspen was $9.5 million. A 2023 study by Savills, a global real estate broker, declared that prime Aspen real estate was the most expensive on a per-square-foot-basis of the 44 global ski resort markets it studied.

Relatively less expensive housing can be found outside the city limits, in nearby Snowmass Village (median single family home price $5.2 million in 2021), or in the city's condos, many of which date to the 1960s and 1970s.

Affordability of housing is a severe challenge for workers in the Aspen area. The Aspen Pitkin County Housing Authority oversees an extensive program of properties intended for people who primarily live and work in the Roaring Fork Valley and whose income falls below certain limits, known as Employee Housing. Homes purchased through Employee Housing programs typically contain deed restrictions to maintain a degree of affordability for local residents, but even deed-restricted properties in the area can cost close to $1 million.

== Sports ==
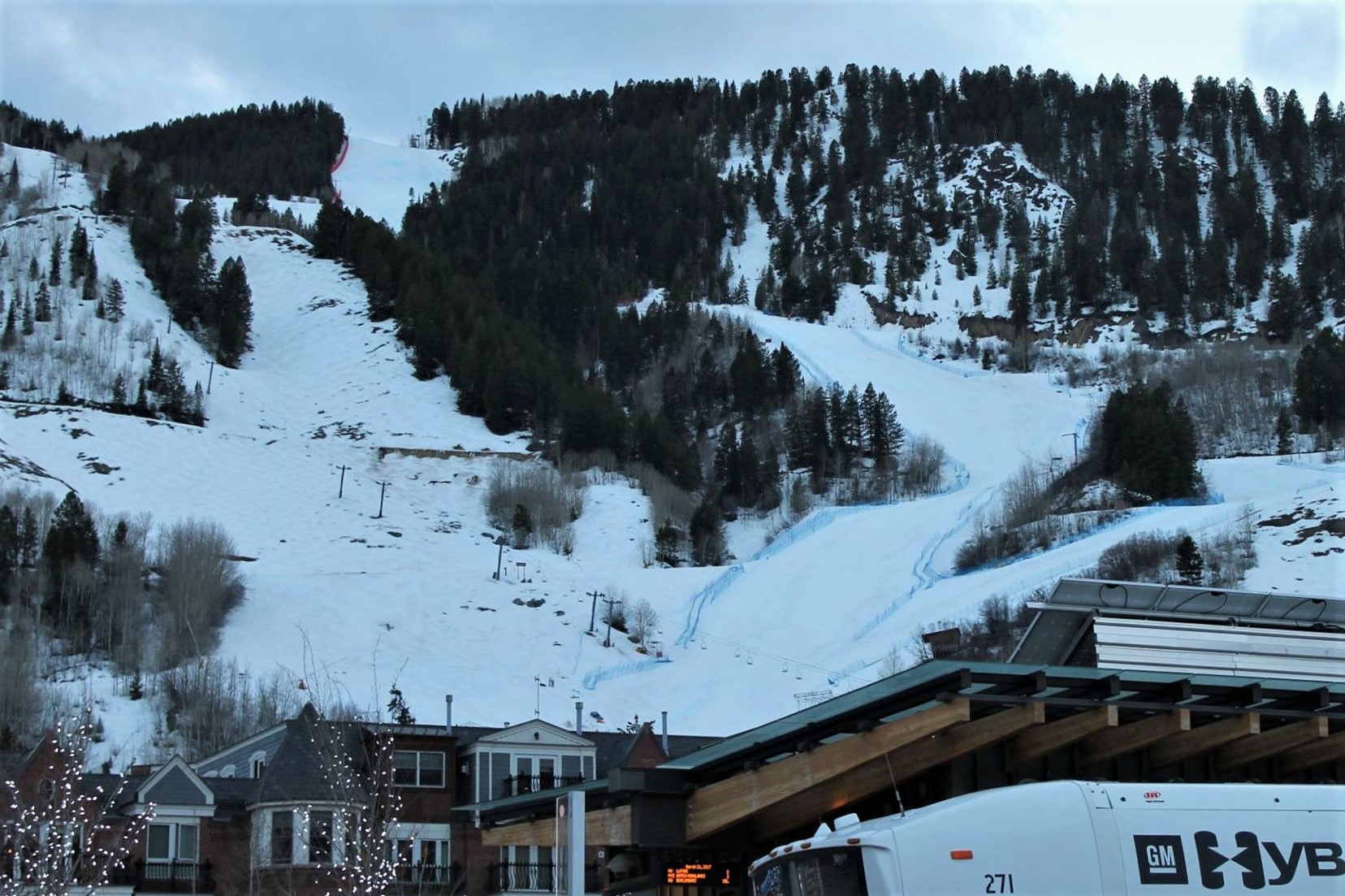
Ski Run from the 2017 World Cup

The Winter X Games sports event has been held in Aspen at Buttermilk (ski area) since 2002. Aspen natives Torin Yater-Wallace and Alex Ferreira are both freestyle skiers who compete in the Winter X Games and have very successful careers. Both Torin and Alex have represented the United States of America in Men's Ski SuperPipe at the Olympic Games.

The Gentlemen of Aspen is the local rugby team. The Gentlemen of Aspen won the Rugby Super League several times: 1997, 2001, and 2002.

== Government ==
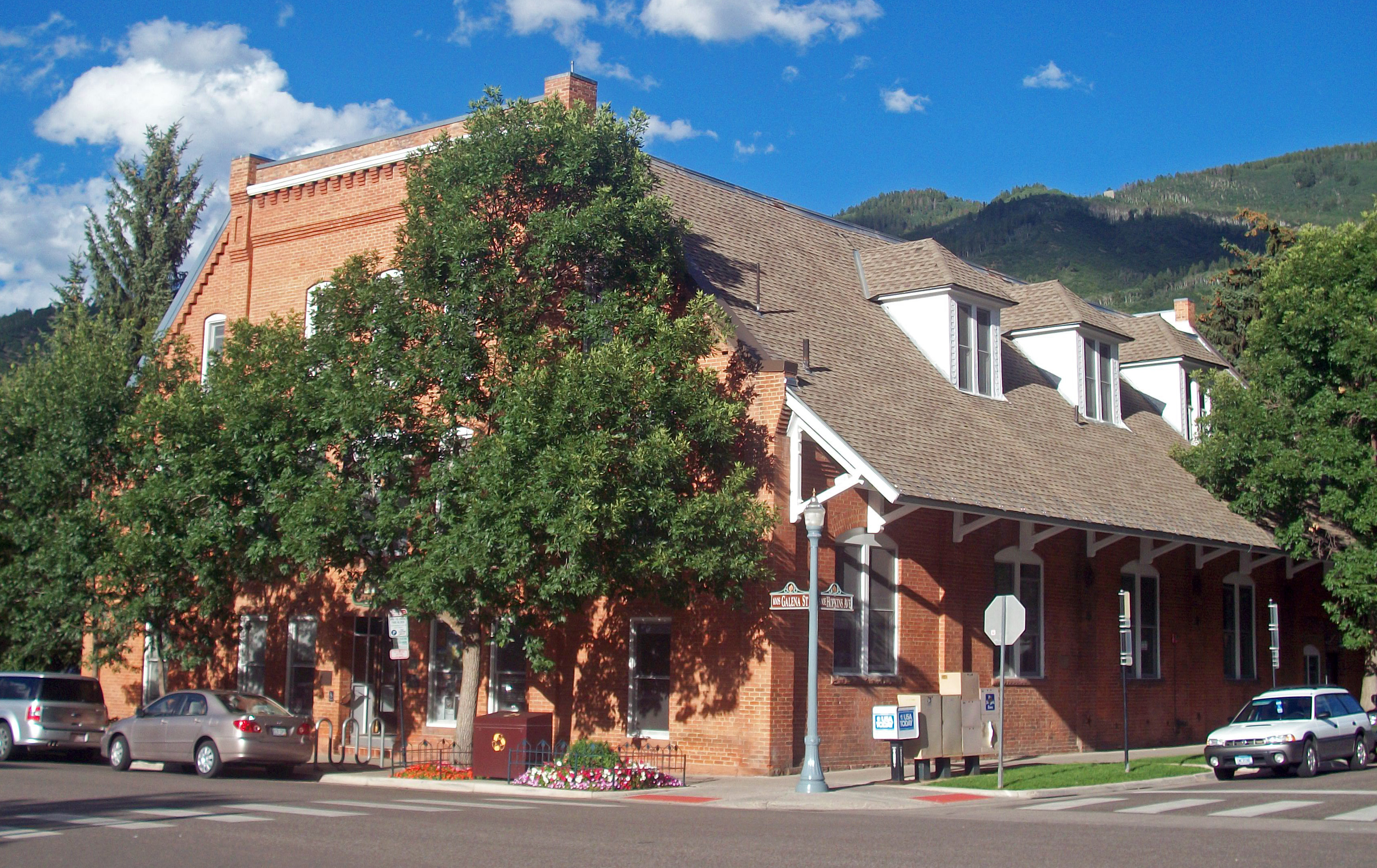
City Hall, formerly Armory Hall

Aspen is a home rule municipality under Colorado law. It has a council-manager government. An elected council of four members and the mayor supervise the city's operations, managed on a day-to-day basis by the city manager, an appointed official who serves at their pleasure.

The city's main office is at City Hall, the former Armory Hall listed on the National Register of Historic Places at the intersection of South Galena Street and East Hopkins Avenue. Because of its expansion in the late-20th century, it has outgrown that space. Several city departments are housed in satellite offices around the city.

== Education ==
The municipality is in Aspen School District 1.

As of 2012, based on data from the 2009–10 school year, according to U.S. News & World Report, Aspen High School, the only high school in the Aspen School District, is the top ranked high school in Colorado and ranked 59th in the United States. The high school has grades 9 to 12, 540 students, and 41 teachers. Olympic cross-country skier Noah Hoffman is a 2007 graduate.

Minorities, mostly Hispanic, make up 13 percent of the school's enrollment. Four percent of the students are economically disadvantaged. The school has a high rate of participation in the International Baccalaureate program.

== Transportation ==
- Roaring Fork Transportation Authority, or RFTA, provides free bus service within Aspen and Snowmass Village, and pay service to the surrounding communities of Basalt, El Jebel, Carbondale, Glenwood Springs, and Rifle. Amtrak serves Glenwood Springs, offering in conjunction with RFTA an environmentally friendly way to travel to Aspen.
- Aspen's airport is Aspen-Pitkin County Airport, also known as Sardy Field. The airport is an FAA Class 1 airport and has one asphalt runway, 100 ft (30 m) wide and 8,006 ft (2,440 m) long. The airport is commercially serviced by American Airlines, Delta Air Lines, and United Airlines.
- State Highway 82 is the only major road that provides access to Aspen. There are some mountain pass roads that lead to the city, but those require all-terrain vehicles and are typically impassable during the winter. Highway 82 east of Aspen is also impassable due to snow on Independence Pass, leaving Highway 82 west of Aspen as the only means of motor vehicle access during the winter. Highway 82 east of Aspen is typically closed from approximately the end of October to Memorial Day, depending on snow conditions.
- The bike-sharing system WE-CYCLE serves Aspen and Basalt with 16 stations and 200 bikes. Docking stations and bikes are built by PBSC Urban Solutions.

== Historic buildings ==
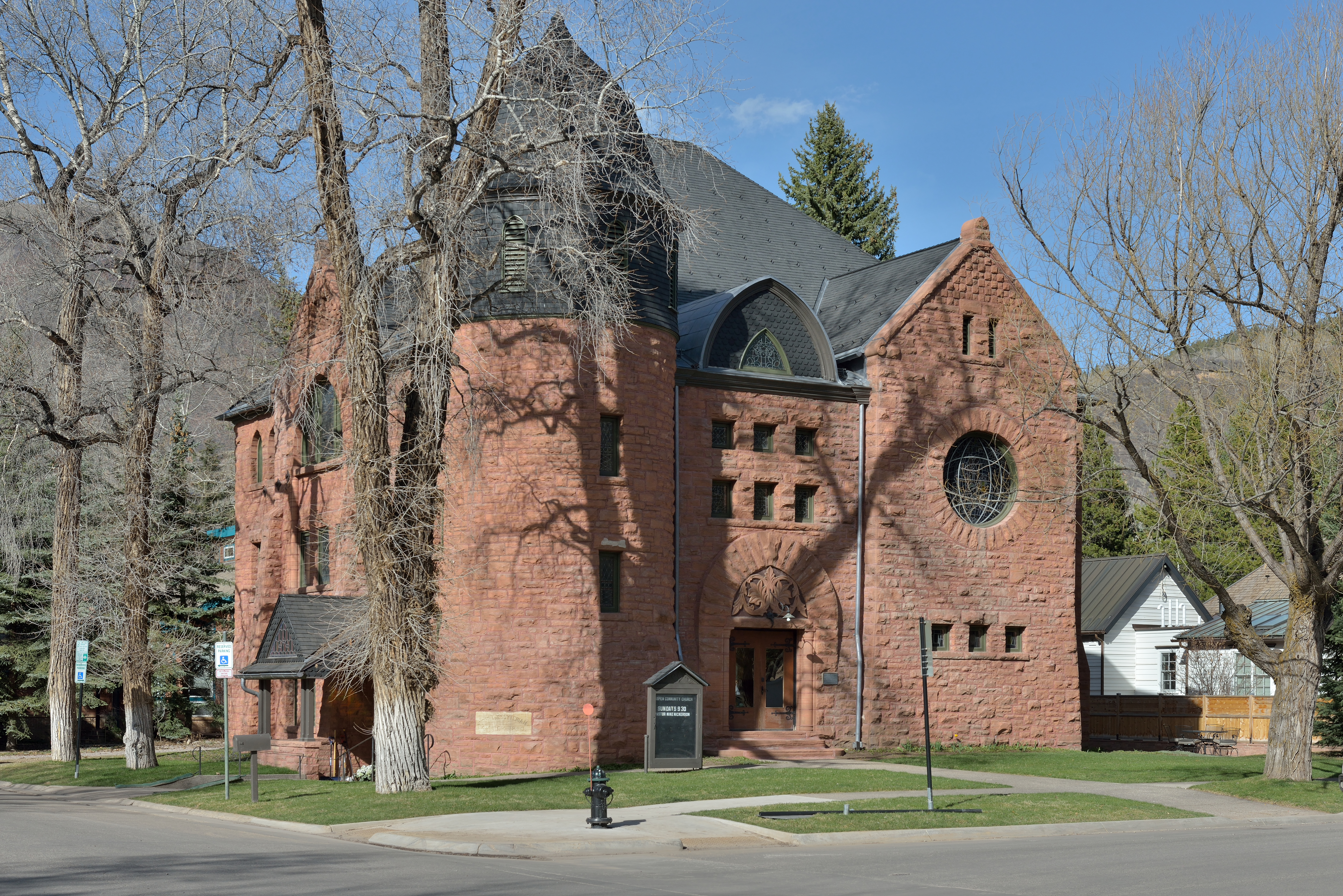
Aspen Community Church

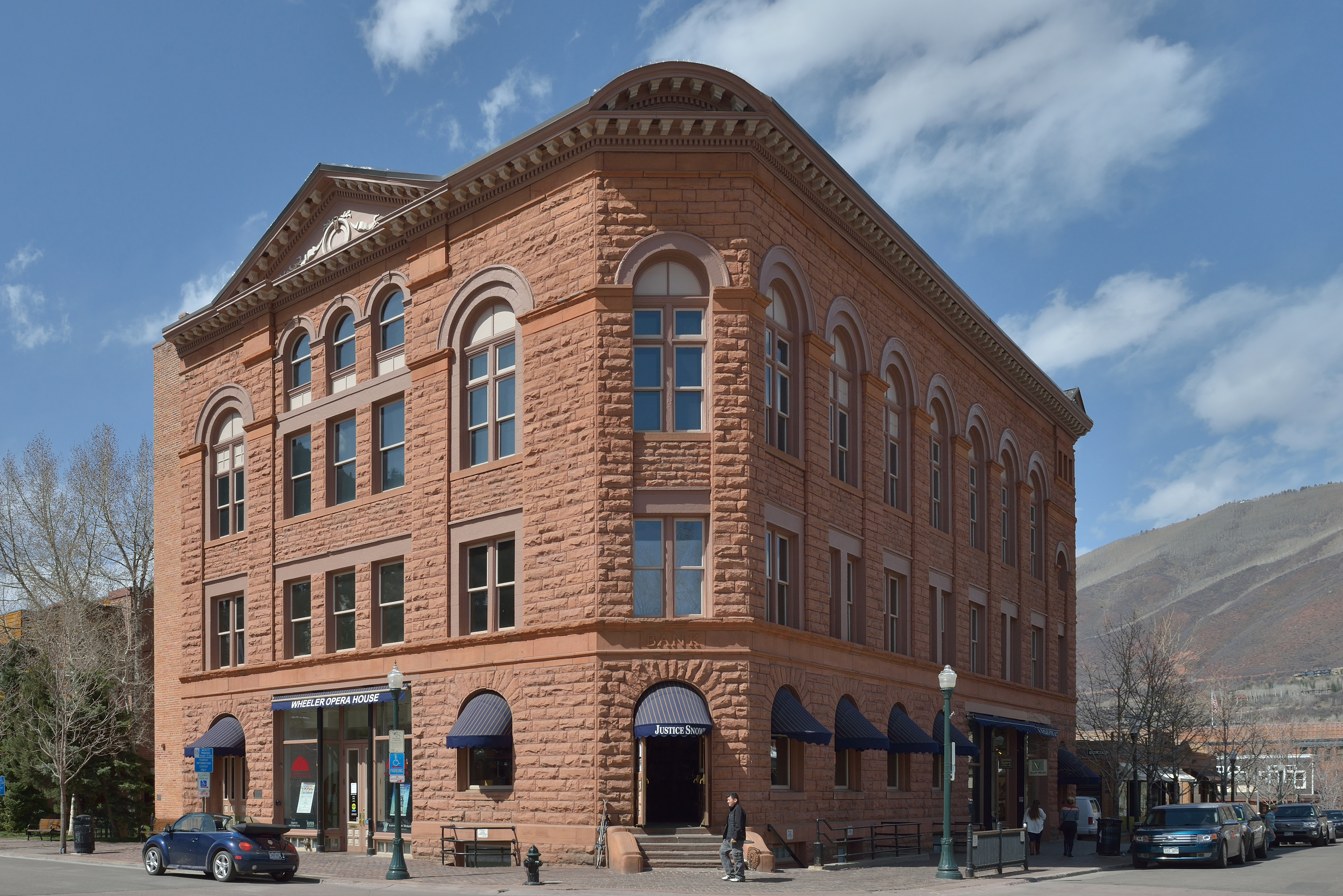
Wheeler Opera House

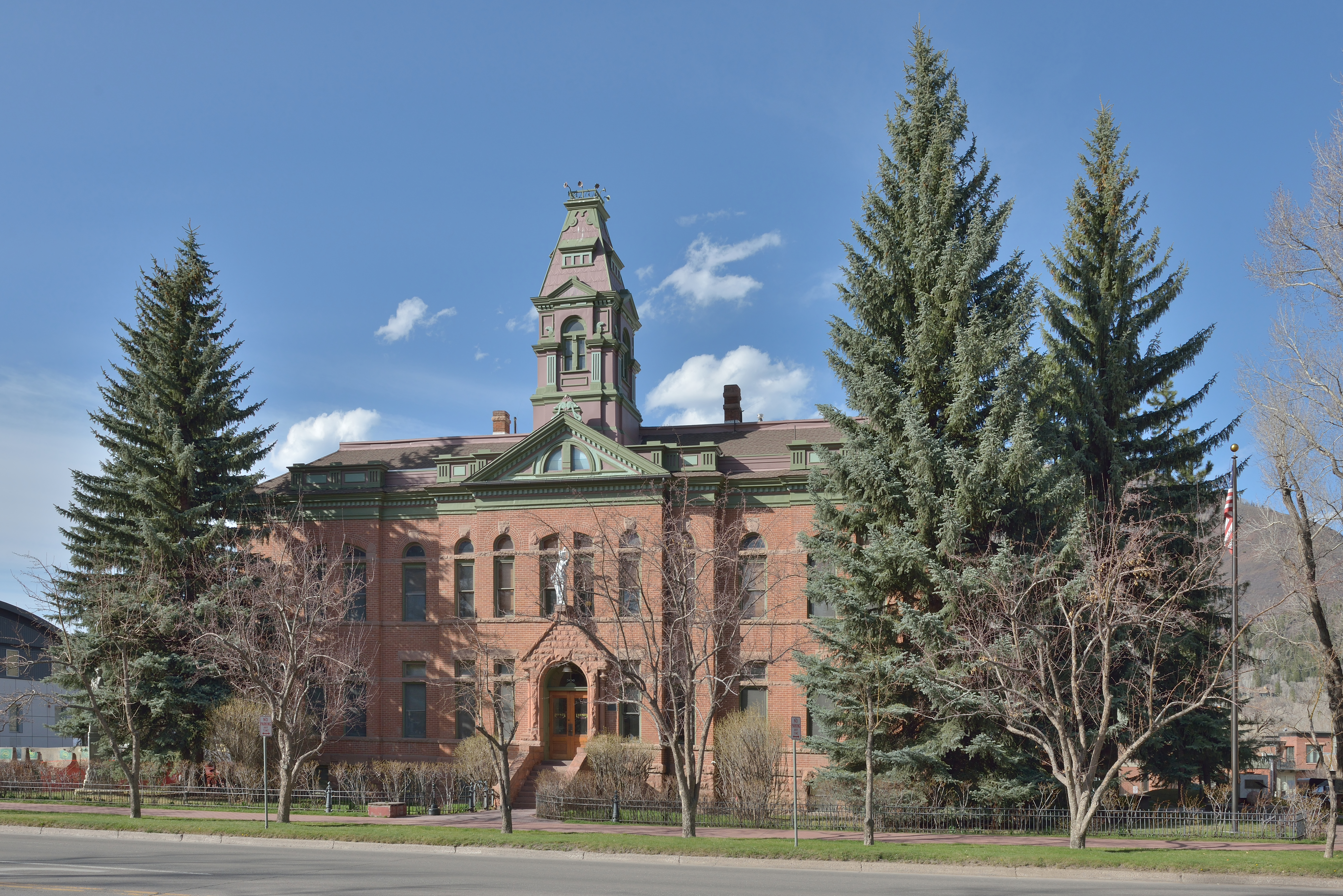
Pitkin County Courthouse

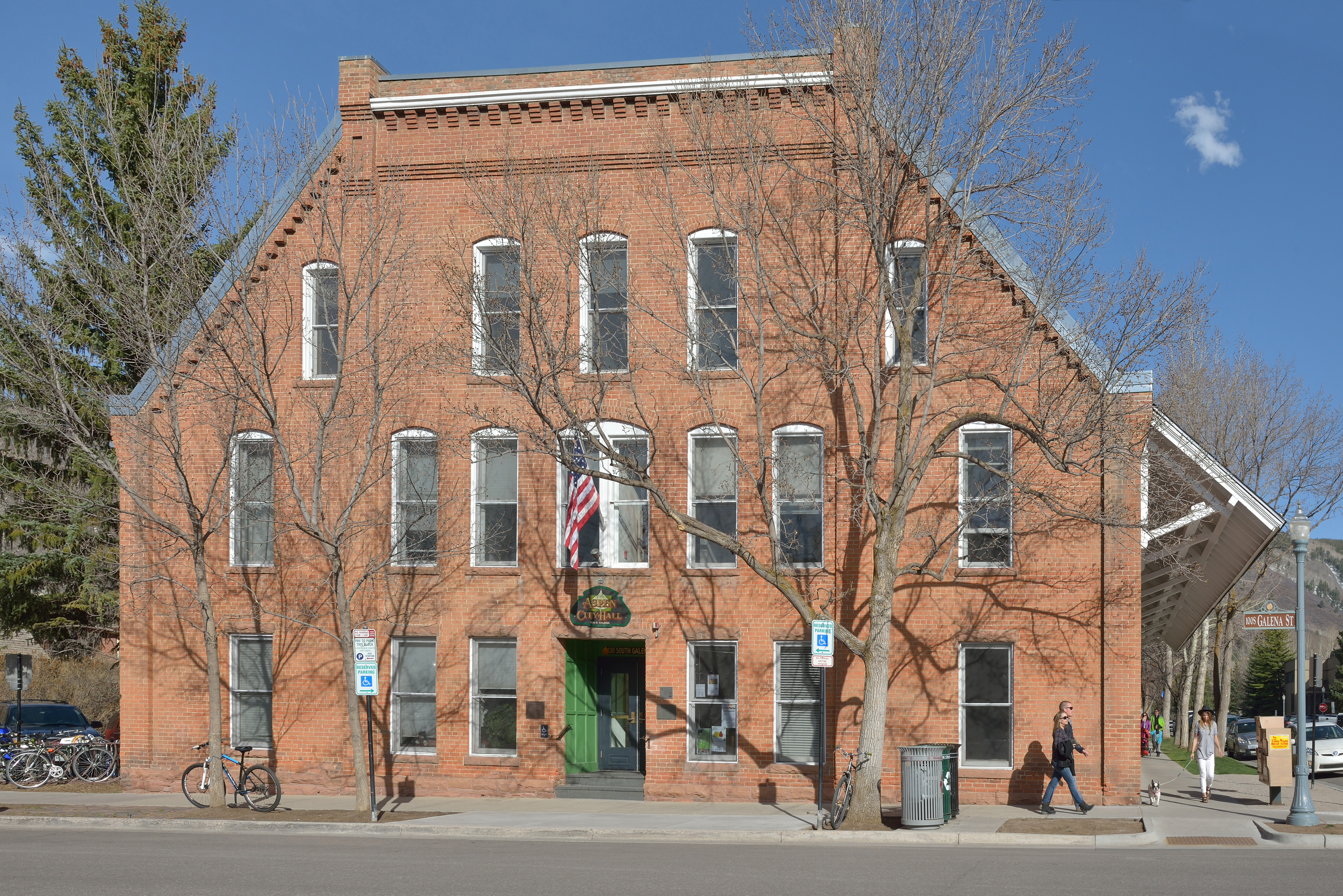
Armory Hall or Fraternal Hall (Aspen City Hall)

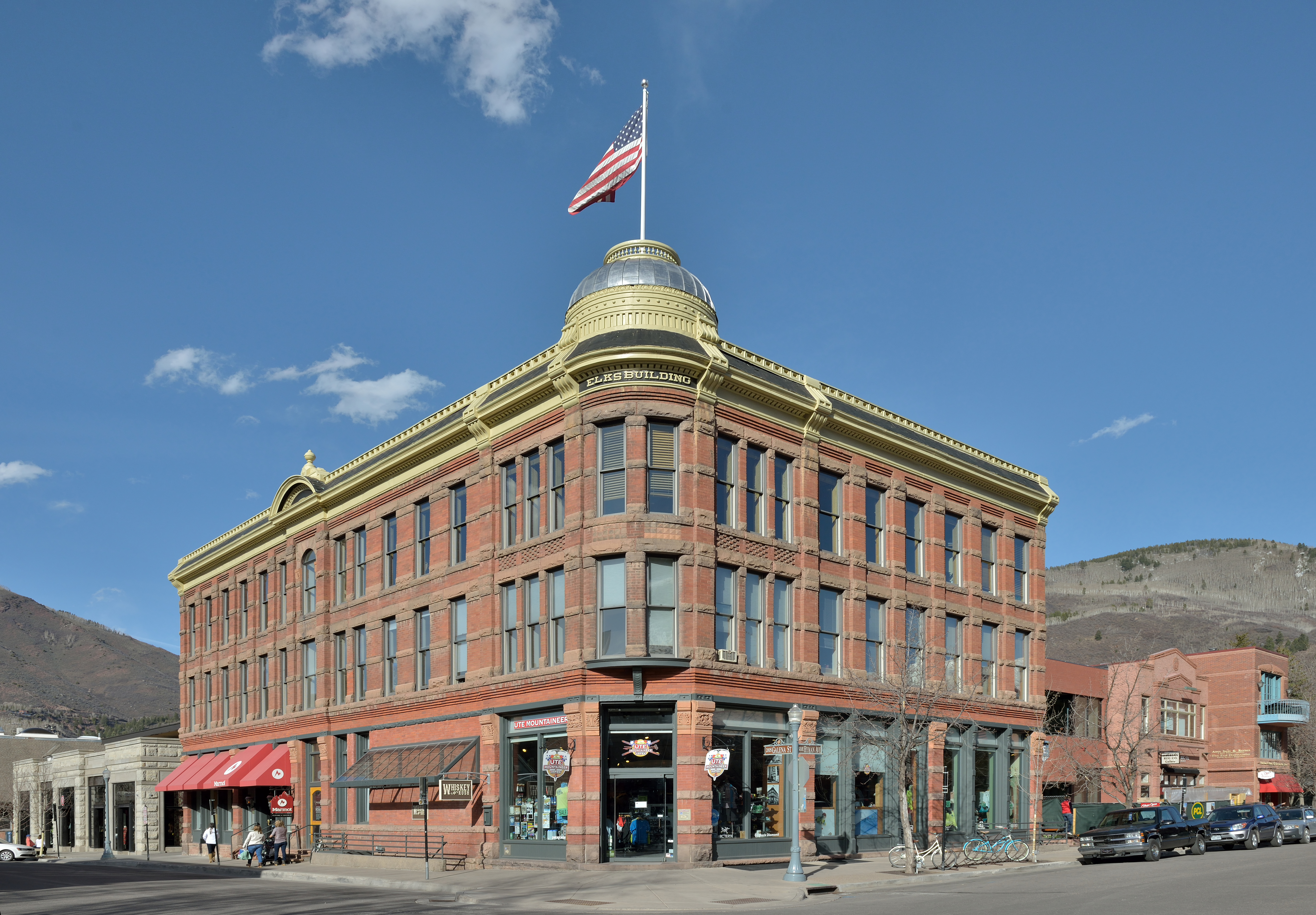
Elks building

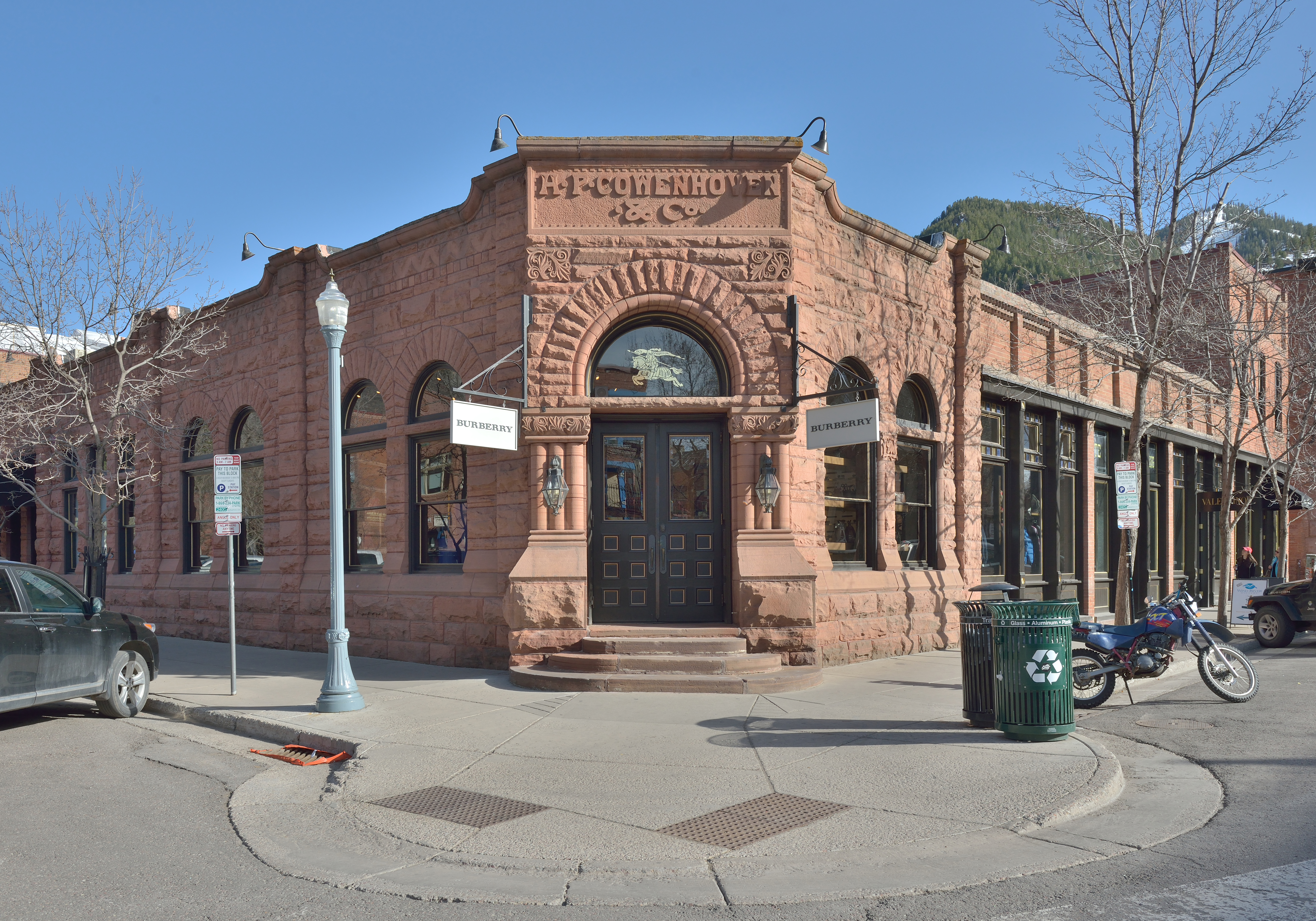
Cowenhoven Ute City Banque building

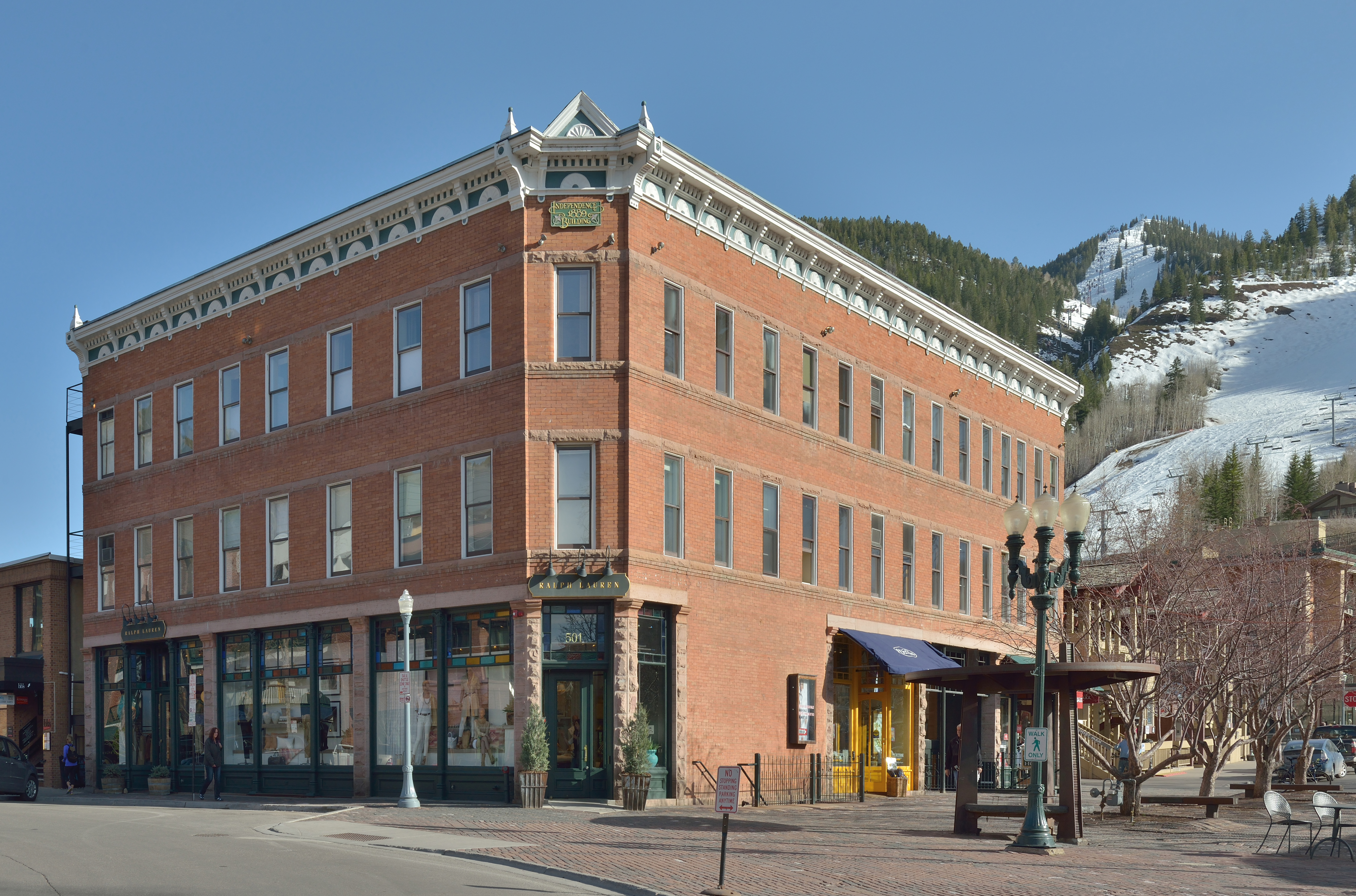
Independence building

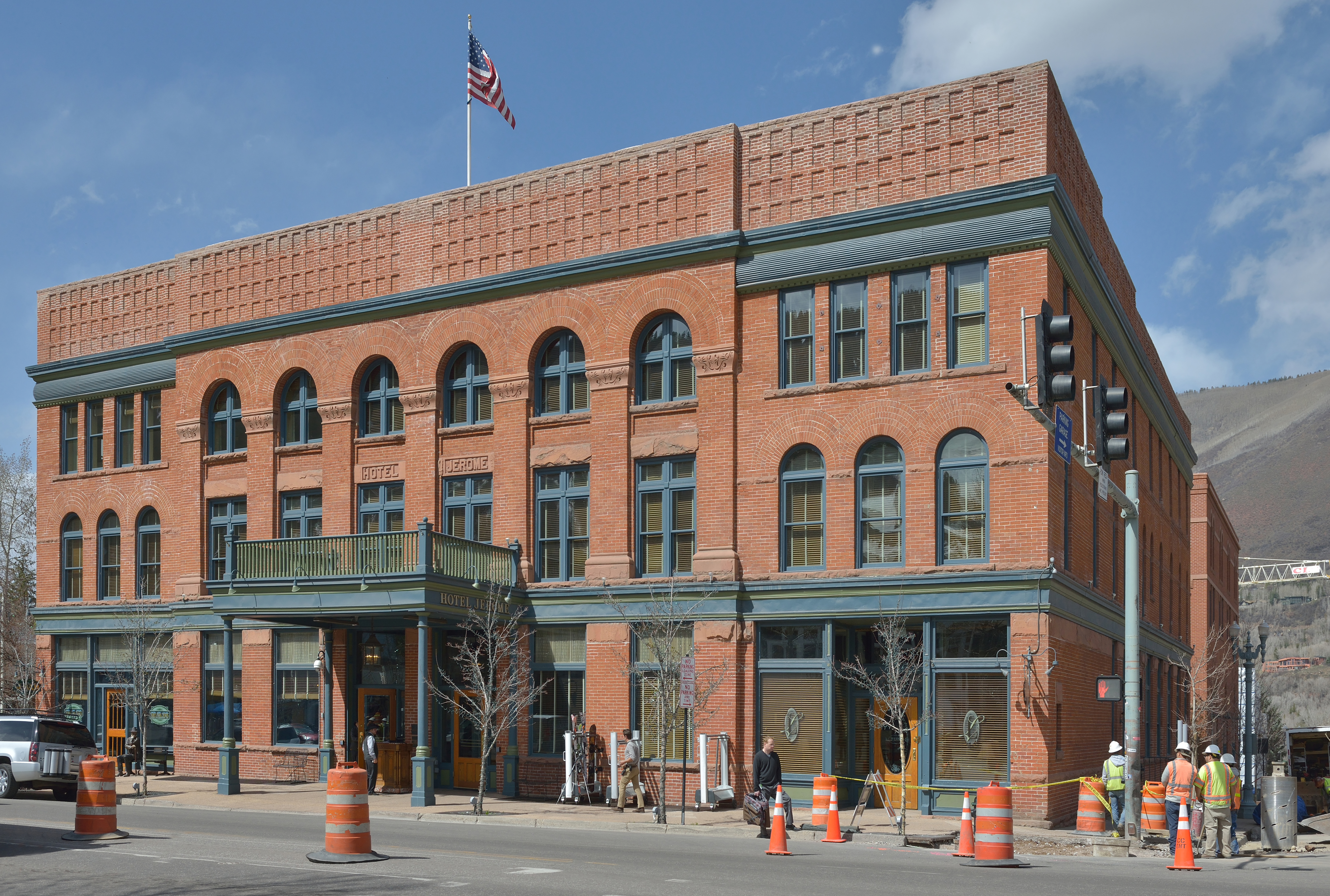
Hotel Jerome

== Sister cities ==
Aspen's sister cities are:

- Abetone Cutigliano, Italy
- Bariloche, Argentina
- Chamonix-Mont-Blanc, France
- Davos, Switzerland
- Garmisch-Partenkirchen, Germany
- Queenstown, New Zealand
- Shimukappu, Japan

== See also ==
- Aspen anomaly
- The Aspen Business Luncheon
- Aspen Center for Physics
- Aspen Institute
- Aspen/Snowmass
- Colorado Silver Boom
- Smuggler Mine
