= Colorado orogeny =

The Colorado orogeny was an episode of mountain building (an orogeny) in Colorado and surrounding areas. This took place from 1780 to 1650 million years ago (Mya), during the Paleoproterozoic (Statherian Period). It is recorded in the Colorado orogen, a >500-km-wide belt of oceanic arc rock that extends southward into New Mexico. The Colorado orogeny was likely part of the larger Yavapai orogeny.

== Description ==
The Colorado orogen, formerly called the Colorado province, is a >500-km-wide belt of oceanic arc rock (1.78–1.65 Ga) that extends southward into New Mexico and composes a major part of the Proterozoic provinces of southwestern United States. This transcontinental collisional event occurred during the Paleoproterozoic (Statherian Period). The Wyoming sector of the Colorado orogeny was formerly called the Medicine Bow orogeny. The eastern sector extends into the High Plains and is called the Central Plains orogeny. The boundary between the Colorado orogeny and the Wyoming craton is the Cheyenne belt, a 5-km-wide mylonitic shear zone that verges northward. The Cheyenne belt transects and cuts off the south edge of the older Trans-Hudson orogeny.

The Paleoproterozoic volcanic and sedimentary rocks that resulted from the Colorado orogeny underwent metamorphism followed by plastic folding under moderate pressure and temperature (PT) conditions (temperature about 500 °C and pressures in excess of 1.2 GPa). The metamorphism was accompanied by intrusion of intermediate calc-alkalic rocks, such as the granodiorites of the Boulder Creek batholith. The accompanying amphibolite facies metamorphism is characterized by sillimanite and, locally, garnet, andalusite, and cordierite. Contemporaneity of emplacement of the granodioritic rocks with folding is indicated by concordant plutonic boundaries and by conformity of the internal structure (of solid-state recrystallization) in the batholith with that in the supracrustal wall rocks. Comparable mineral facies in the country rocks and batholiths indicate that emplacement took place at moderate depths.

As is typical of large orogenies deformation patterns of the Colorado orogeny differ throughout the range. Adjacent to the Cheyenne belt, and extending across a width of at least 150 km to the south, foliation and upright folds predominantly trend westward. In the northern Front Range sector of this region, geologic mapping demonstrated three generations of northwest-trending folds that pre-date the ~1.4 Ga shear zones. Similar fold patterns are present in the northern Park Range and Medicine Bow Mountains. These structural fabrics indicate shortening in a north-south direction and can be explained by collision, subsequent subduction, and continued convergence along the Cheyenne belt. Farther south, more distant from the Cheyenne belt, fold patterns differ materially from those in the northernmost part of the Colorado orogeny. In the north-central Front Range, west of Denver, in an area of >2000 km^{2} that has been mapped in detail the older regional folds mainly bear north-northeast; the folds range from broad open, upright folds to tight, upright folds that plunge gently to moderately northeast. In nearby areas to the east and west, however, the folds of the older orogenic event trend northwest; field observations indicate that these folds apparently are slightly older than the more prevalent north-trending folds, but both generations are part of the older gneiss-forming episode inasmuch as they are cut by the Boulder Creek batholith. Both sets of these folds indicate shortening events resulting from regional stress patterns. Because of the consistency of these fold patterns over relatively large areas, evidence for folding resulting from forceful intrusion of igneous rocks is generally lacking; intrusions of this orogenic event are synkinematic, as exemplified by the much-studied Boulder Creek batholith.

The Colorado orogeny was likely part of the larger Yavapai orogeny, which extended across North America and probably to other continents that were joined to North America as part of the supercontinent, Columbia.
