= Grouse Creek =

Grouse Creek can refer to:

- Grouse Creek (British Columbia), a creek in Canada
- Grouse Creek (Humboldt County, California) a creek in Humboldt County, California
- Grouse Creek (Placer County, California) a creek in Placer County, California
- Grouse Creek, Utah an unincorporated community in Utah
- Grouse Creek block, geology

== See also ==
- Crouse Creek, a stream in the Uinta Mountains, Utah, United States
