= SWEAT (hypothesis) =

Geological hypothesis

SWEAT (which stands for Southwestern United States and East Antarctica) is the hypothesis that the Southwestern United States was at one time connected to East Antarctica.

The hypothesis of a late Precambrian fit of western North America with the Australia-Antarctic shield region permits the extension of many features through Antarctica and into other parts of Gondwana. For example, the Grenville orogen may extend around the coast of East Antarctica into India and Australia, and the ophiolitic belt of the latter may extend into East Antarctica. The Wopmay orogen of northwest Canada may extend through eastern Australia into Antarctica and thence beneath the ice to connect with the Yavapai-Mazatzal orogens of the southwestern United States. Counterparts of the Precambrian-Paleozoic sedimentary rocks along the U.S. Cordilleran miogeocline may be present in the Transantarctic Mountains. Orogen boundaries provide useful piercing points for Precambrian continental reconstructions.

The model implies that Gondwana and Laurentia drifted away from each other on one margin and collided some 300 million years later on their opposite margins to form the Appalachians.

== Evidence ==
A paper published by an international team of U.S. and Australian investigators led by John Goodge gives significant support to the theory. The team's findings were made in the Transantarctic Mountains and provide physical evidence that confirms the SWEAT hypothesis.

The team was searching in Antarctica's Transantarctic Mountains for rocks carried along by ice rivers that could provide clues to the composition of the underlying crust of Antarctica, which in most places is buried under approximately 3,200 meters (2 mi) of ice. One rock, found atop Nimrod Glacier, was later determined to be a very specific form of granite which has a particular type of coarse-grained texture (called rapakivi texture.) Chemical tests run on the rock revealed that it has a radiometric age and stable isotope ratios closely matching those of a distinctive belt of rapakivi granite in North America that stretches from California through New Mexico to Kansas, Illinois in the United States, and eventually New Brunswick and Newfoundland in Canada. This belt of rock was a part of Laurentia, thought by some geologists to be the core of Rodinia. This belt stops suddenly at its western margin, leading geologists to suspect that some piece of crust had rifted away from what is now the West Coast of the United States.

== East Antarctica–Laurentia juxtaposition ==
The positions of Laurentia and other landmasses in the Precambrian supercontinent of Rodinia are controversial. Although geological and isotopic data support an East Antarctic fit with western Laurentia, alternative reconstructions favor the juxtaposition of Australia, Siberia, or South China. New geologic, age, and isotopic data provide a positive test of the juxtaposition with East Antarctica: Neodymium isotopes of Neoproterozoic rift-margin strata are similar; hafnium isotopes of about 1.4 billion year old Antarctic-margin detrital zircons match those in Laurentian granites of similar age; and a glacial clast of A-type granite has a uranium-lead zircon age of c.1440 million years, an epsilon-hafnium initial value of +7, and an epsilon-neodymium initial value of +4. These tracers indicate the presence of granites in East Antarctica having the same age, geochemical properties, and isotopic signatures as the distinctive granites in Laurentia.
