= The Aspen Business Luncheon =

The Aspen Business Luncheon is a decades-old tradition held in Aspen, Colorado.

The aim of the Luncheon is to provide weekly meetings between the local community and distinguished speakers, including former Secretary of State Madeleine Albright, New York Times author Thomas Friedman and Colorado governor John Hickenlooper.

== History ==
Previously named Aspen's "Friday Men's Lunch," the lunch was opened up to women by Todd Shaver in his reorganization of the tradition in 2010 after 35 years.

The gathering usually occurs every Wednesday.

== Notable attendees ==
- Tom Friedman, columnist, New York Times
- Tony Malkin, owner of the Empire State Building
- Dr. Naresh Mandava, eye surgeon at Anschutz Medical Campus in Denver
- Tom Korologos – former Ambassador to Belgium
- Fred Malek – former head of Marriott Hotels and Northwest Airlines
- Jerry Greenwald – former CEO and chairman of the Board of United Airlines
- Harvey Mackay – author of Swim with the Sharks Before Getting Eaten Alive
- Walter Isaacson - author of Steve Jobs and CEO of The Aspen Institute
- Goldie Hawn
- David Bonderman, CEO of TPG, a private equity firm.
