= Yavapai orogeny =

Mountain building event 1.7 billion years ago in the southwestern United States

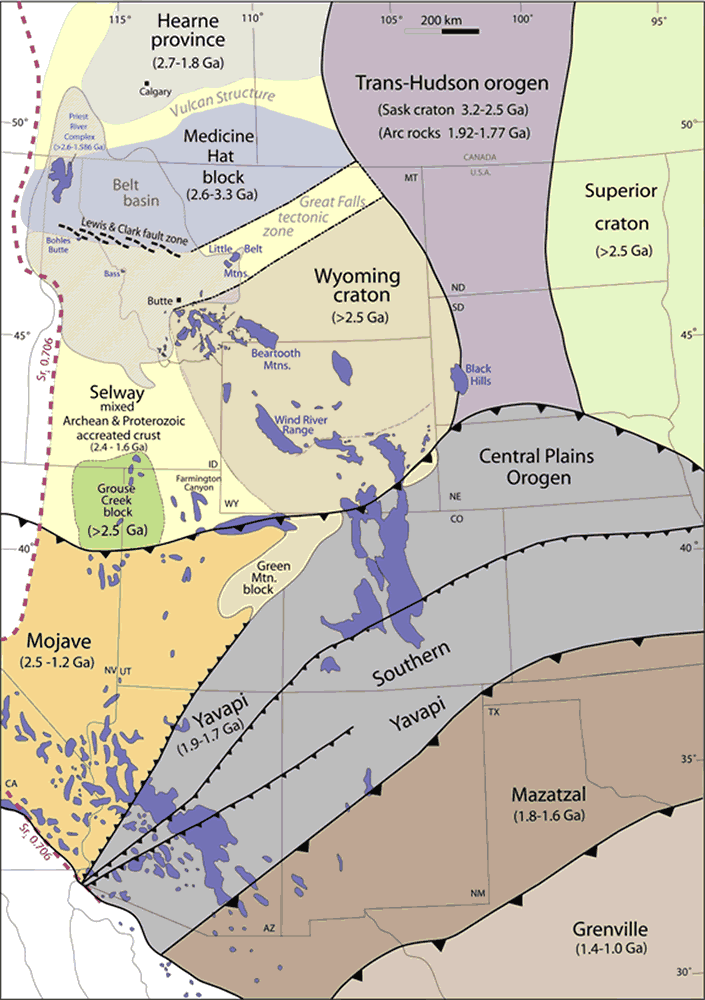
Precambrian provinces of western North America, showing the Yavapai Province (in dark grey)

The Yavapai orogeny was an orogenic (mountain-building) event in what is now the Southwestern United States that occurred between 1710 and 1680 million years ago (Mya), in the Statherian Period of the Paleoproterozoic. Recorded in the rocks of New Mexico and Arizona, it is interpreted as the collision of the 1800-1700 Mya age Yavapai island arc terrane with the proto-North American continent. This was the first in a series of orogenies within a long-lived convergent boundary along southern Laurentia that ended with the ca. 1200–1000 Mya Grenville orogeny during the final assembly of the supercontinent Rodinia, which ended an 800-million-year episode of convergent boundary tectonism.

== Description ==
Age and isotope data show that southern North America is composed of a series of northeast-trending provinces representing island arc terranes accreted onto the 1800 Mya core of Laurentia. These are the Yavapai province (1800–1700 Mya), the Mazatzal province (1700–1650 Mya), the Granite-Rhyolite province (1500–1300 Mya), and the Llano-Grenville province (1300–1000 Mya). Each is interpreted as juvenile crust of an island arc, together with smaller amounts of reworked older crust, that accreted to Laurentia in an orogenic pulse accompanied by pluton emplacement. The plutons sutured new and existing orogens together and helped convert the juvenile terranes to mature crust. The orogen pulses are identified as the Yavapai orogeny at 1710–1680 Mya, the Mazatzal orogeny at 1650–1600 Ga, the Picuris orogeny at 1450–1300 Mya, and the Grenville orogeny at 1300–950 Mya.

Some of the orogens were accompanied by slab rollback. This created short-lived extensional basins at 1700 and 1650 Mya that accumulated sand and high-silica volcanic debris to form Paleoproterozoic quartzite-rhyolite successions. Subsequent convergent tectonics closed the basins and thrust imbricated the successions. That is, faulted blocks of rock were stacked atop each other like shingles on a roof.

The northeast-trending provinces are truncated by Neoproterozoic passive margins that indicate the orogenic system once extended much further. This is part of the basis for the AUSWUS reconstruction of Rodinia, which places Australia adjacent to the southwestern US from 1800 to 1000 Mya. Other supporting evidence includes correspondence of 1450 and 1000 Ga paleomagnetic poles between Australia and Laurentia. The northeastern extension of the orogenic belt would then correspond to the Gothian orogeny in Baltica and the southwestern extension to the Albany-Fraser orogeny. However, the placement of Australia has been disputed on the basis of paleomagnetic data. The SWEAT reconstruction places East Antarctica on the southwest extension of the Yavapai Province.

The Yavapai Province was named for the Yavapai Supergroup in central Arizona. It extends from Arizona to Colorado south of the Cheyenne belt, then northeastward to the mid-continent region. The southern boundary is somewhat poorly defined, possibly because it corresponds to a shallow relic subduction zone, but runs roughly along the Jemez Lineament. Individual island arc terranes accreted to Laurentia during the Yavapai Orogeny include the Elves Chasm block in the Grand Canyon, Green Mountain, Dubois-Cochetopa, Irving Formation, Moppin-Gold Hill, and Ash Creek-Payson. The latter includes the Payson Ophiolite. Quartzite-rhyolite successions associated with extensional basins include the Vadito Group and Hondo Group in New Mexico and the Mazatzal Group in Arizona, deposited during the transition from the Yavapai to the Mazatzal orogens at 1700 Mya. The extensional basin in which the Mazatzal Group was deposited lasted about 30 Ma, from the Payson Ophiolite at 1730 Mya to the Mazatzal Peak Quartzite sometime after 1700 Mya.

A number of regional orogenies fall within the time span of the Yavapai orogeny and are regarded as parts of the overall orogenic system. These include the Ivanpah orogeny (1710–1680 Mya) in the New York Mountains area; the Central Plains orogeny in the mid-continent; the Medicine Bow orogeny at 1708–1750 Mya that produced the Cheyenne belt, the Colorado province or Colorado orogeny at 1780–1700 Mya.

Metasomatic tourmalinites dated to 1680 Mya found within the Cerro Colorado Tusas Mountains in Ojo Caliente New Mexico suggest that there was a localized crustal boron sequestration event during the Yavapai Orogeny.

== See also ==
- List of orogenies
- Geology of Arizona
- Geology of New Mexico
