= Yavapai Supergroup =

Sequence of rock strata

- Stratigraphic range: Paleoproterozoic, between 1820 and 1770 Ma
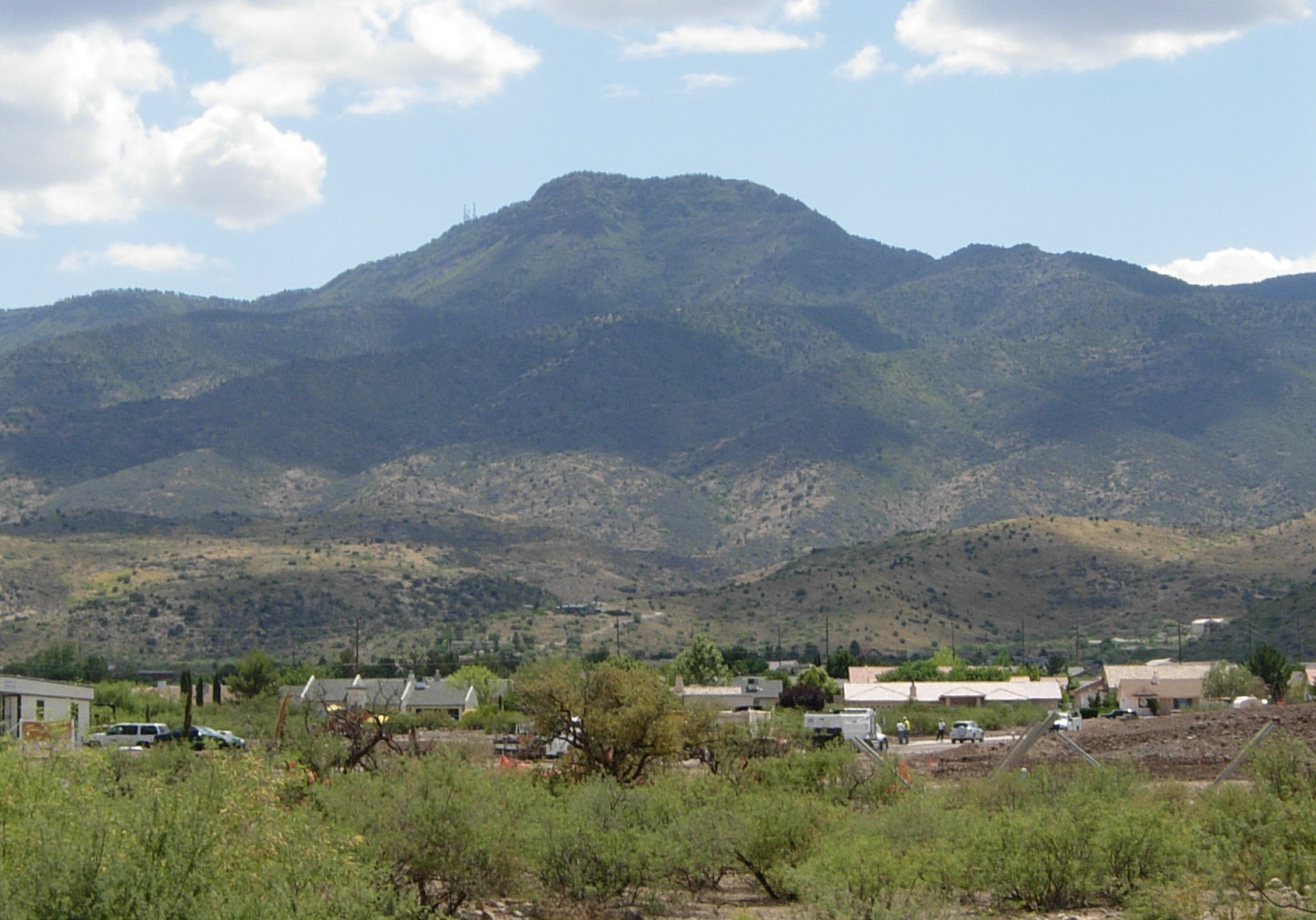
- Mingus Mountain is underlain by the Yavapai Supergroup
- Type: Supergroup
- Sub-units: Big Bug Group; Ash Creek Group
- Thickness: 7,000 ft (2,100 m)

Lithology
- Primary: Schist
- Other: Metavolcanic rock, metasedimentary rock

Location
- Coordinates: 34.51°N 112.55°W
- Region: Arizona
- Country: United States

Type section
- Named for: Yavapai County, Arizona
- Named by: T.A. Jaggar, Jr., and Charles Palache
- Year defined: 1905
- Yavapai Supergroup (the United States) Yavapai Supergroup (Arizona)

The Yavapai Supergroup is a Paleoproterozoic supergroup of metavolcanic and metasedimentary rock strata, partially exposed in Arizona, US. The corresponding chronostratigraphic unit is the Yavapai Series, which locally defines an interval of geologic time. The Yavapai Supergroup gives its name to the Yavapai orogeny, a major mountain-building event that took place in the U.S. Southwest in the Paleoproterozoic.

== Geology ==
The Yavapai Supergroup is extensively exposed in Yavapai County, Arizona, from which it takes its name. Exposures are found from the Jerome — Prescott area southwest to Mingus Mountain and in other parts of the Arizona transition zone. The supergroup contains a variety of lithologies (rock types). The beds of the supergroup were laid down between 1820 and 1770 million years ago.

== History of investigation ==
The beds belonging to the unit were first named as the "Arizonian" by W.P. Blake in 1899. They were subsequently formally named as the Yavapai Schist by Thomas Jaggar and Charles Palache in 1905. Jaggar and Palache recognized that the unit showed a great diversity of rock types and degree of metamorphism but was mostly metasedimentary rock. They estimated its maximum thickness at about 7,000 feet (2,100 m). E.D. Wilson investigated the unit again in 1939, raising it to group rank, dividing it into the Yaeger greenstone, Red Rock Rhyolite, and Alder sedimentary series. Wilson also recognized that the beds had been seriously deformed during the early Proterozoic and named this episode the Mazatzal orogeny.

C.A Anderson and various coinvestigators studied the unit between 1955 and 1971, ultimately defining it as a chronostratigraphic unit (the Yavapai Series) representing the interval of time in which the Ash Creek Group and Big Bug Group were deposited. Other researchers have defined the Yavapai Supergroup as a lithostratigraphic unit.
