= Grouse Creek block =

Accreted terrane west of the Wyoming craton

Coordinates: 41°N 115°W

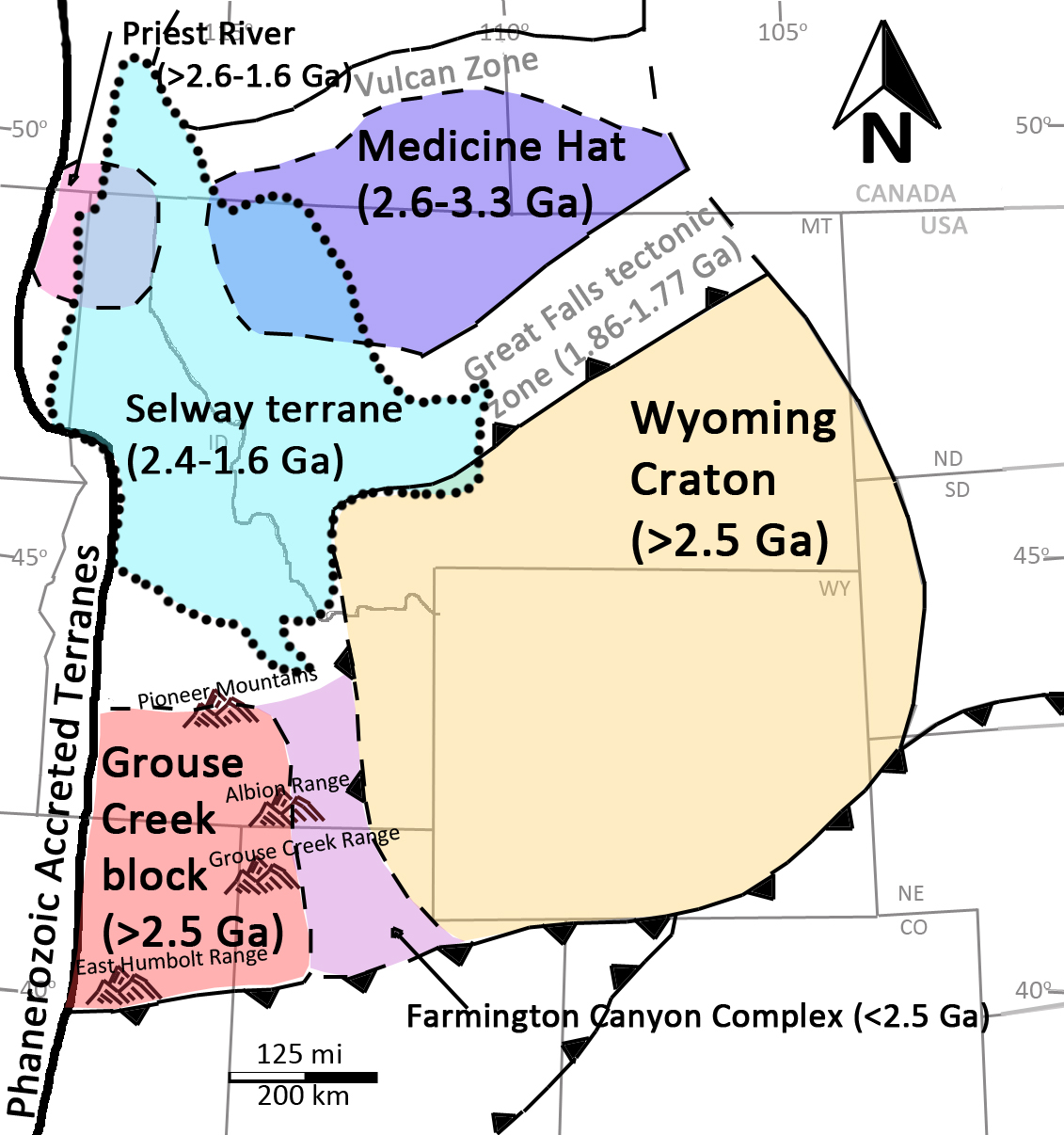
Fig. 1. Location of the Grouse Creek block and relevant adjacent geologic and geographic landmarks.

The Grouse Creek block is a Precambrian basement province of 2.45 to 2.70 billion year old orthogneisses. The Grouse Creek block is one of several Proterozoic and Archean accreted terranes that lie to the north and west of the Wyoming craton, including the Farmington Canyon Complex (<2.5 Ga), the Selway terrane (2.4-1.6 Ga), the Medicine Hat block (2.6-3.3 Ga) and the Priest River complex (>2.6-1.5 Ga). Together, these terranes comprise part of the basement rock of the North American continent and have been critical to studies of crustal accretion in the Precambrian. Ongoing study of the Grouse Creek block will contribute to understanding the paleogeography of the Wyoming craton prior to its incorporation into the supercontinent Laurentia approximately 1.86 billion years ago. The name was proposed by David Foster and others.

== Geographic and geologic boundaries ==
The location of the Grouse Creek block has been determined at some points by determining the age when minerals were metamorphosed through isotopic analysis of uranium, strontium, neodymium and lead. The ages matched characteristic outcropping Archean orthogneisses. Outcrops have been sampled in the Pioneer Mountains, the Albion Range, the East Humboldt Range, and the Grouse Creek Range. Results indicate that while surface exposures of the Grouse Creek block are rare, the extent of the block is large, reaching from southern Idaho to northeastern Nevada and northwestern Utah (Fig. 1). The boundaries of the block remain a topic of significant study.

North Boundary: North of the Snake River Plain to at least the Pioneer Core Complex.

East Boundary: It is generally accepted that the eastern edge is separated from the Wyoming craton by Paleoproterozoic rocks of the Farmington Canyon Complex in the Wasatch Range of Utah.

South Boundary: May occur between the East Humboldt Range and Ruby Mountains in Nevada where U-Pb geochronology and Sr, Nd and Pb isotope analysis of intrusive rocks indicate Archean basement is truncated by Proterozoic basement of the Cheyenne Belt.

West Boundary: Not well defined largely due to a lack of outcropping rock, though it has been hypothesized that the block could extend to the Neoproterozoic Cordilleran rift margin.

== History of study ==
Initial geochronology of the Grouse Creek block in 1967 provided age dates identical to those of the Wyoming craton, causing the margin between the two to be blurred. The Grouse Creek block was later proposed as a separate terrane following the discovery of outcropping 2.45 to 1.6 billion year old Paleoproterozoic metasedimentary rocks of the Farmington Canyon Complex in the Wasatch Range of Utah separating the block from the Wyoming craton. There is still debate as to whether the Grouse Creek block is distinct from the Wyoming Craton at depth. Geologists proposed three hypotheses for the provenance of the Grouse Creek block:

1. The Grouse Creek block could be an accreted Archean block.
2. It may be a re-accreted rifted fragment of the Wyoming craton.
3. Or the block could be a part of the Wyoming craton separated by a younger intracratonic rift.

Geo- and thermochronologic data indicates mountain building and magmatism in the Farmington Canyon Complex at 2.45 and 1.8 billion years ago can be attributed to accretion of the Grouse Creek block to the Wyoming craton in the Paleoproterozoic. The Wyoming craton can be differentiated from other Archean terranes by an enriched ^{207}Pb/^{204}Pb ratio that is hypothesized to represent early crustal extraction, as well as samarium and neodymium ratios providing rock ages of up to 4.0 Ga. Investigation of lead and neodymium isotope ratios in the Grouse Creek block provide evidence that it is chemically unique with respect to the Wyoming craton, corroborating past studies indicating the accretion of the terrane to the western margin of the Wyoming craton in the Paleoproterozoic (Fig. 2).

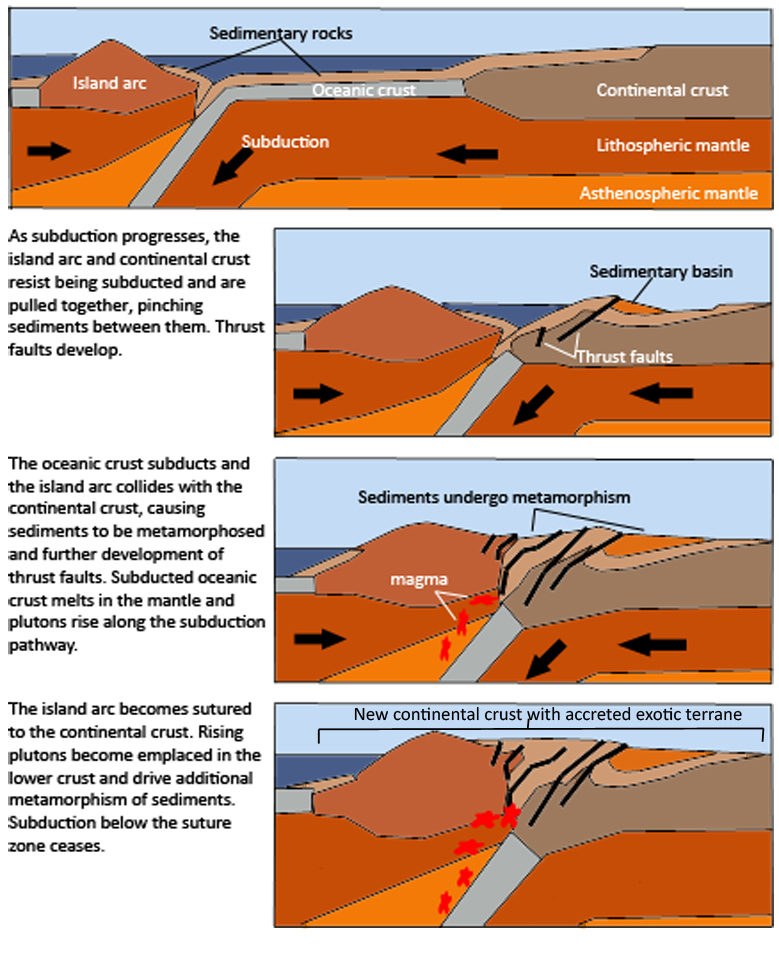
Fig. 2. Possible sequence of an accretionary event involving an exotic terrane and a continental landmass. Accretion of the Grouse Creek block onto the Wyoming craton is proposed to occur through this process.
