= Central Plains orogeny =

Origin theory for geologic formation in the U.S.

The Central Plains orogeny was a mountain building event in the Proterozoic from 1630 to 1800 million years ago, preserved in the subsurface of Nebraska, Kansas, and Missouri, US. The event is closely related to the Yavapai orogeny and may have had the same underlying causes.

== Description ==
The orogen is over 1,000 kilometers (620 mi) long and at least 500 kilometers (310 mi) in width. It consists of granitic and metamorphic rock ranging in age from 1,630 to 1,800 million years in age, and is regarded as an extension of the fold belt of similar age in Colorado and southeastern Wyoming. It truncates the Penokean and Trans-Hudson orogenic belts of the Archean Superior province, which are 1830 to 1950 million years in age.

The orogen has been interpreted as part of the Yavapai orogeny, which welded a set of island arcs to the margin of Laurentia (the ancient core of North America) between 1780 and 1680 million years ago.

== See also ==
- List of orogenies
