= Ash Creek Group =

Sequence of rock strata

- Stratigraphic range: Paleoproterozoic, between 1820 and 1770 Ma
- Type: Group
- Unit of: Yavapai Supergroup
- Sub-units: Grapevine Gulch Formation; Bullseye Rhyolite; Cleopatra Rhyolite; Deception Rhyolite; Shea Basalt; Buzzard Rhyolite; Gaddes Basalt
- Underlies: Big Bug Group
- Thickness: 20,000 ft (6,100 m)

Lithology
- Primary: Metavolcanic rock

Location
- Coordinates: 34.62°N 112.11°W
- Region: Arizona
- Country: United States

Type section
- Named for: Ash Creek
- Named by: C.A. Anderson and S.C. Creasey
- Year defined: 1958
- Ash Creek Group (the United States) Ash Creek Group (Arizona)

The Ash Creek Group is a group of geologic formations exposed in the Mingus Mountains of Arizona, US. The age of the formations is between 1770 and 1820 million years.

== Geology ==
The Ash Creek Group consists of metavolcanic rocks. These are divided into seven formations, which, in order of decreasing age, are the Gaddes Basalt, the Buzzard Rhyolite, the Shea Basalt, the Deception Rhyolite, the Cleopatra Rhyolite, the Bullseye Rhyolite, and the Grapevine Gulch Formation. The Gaddes Basalt consists mostly of pillow lava; the Buzzard Rhyolite of rhyolite flows and volcaniclastics; the Shea Basalt of basalt flows with some local pillow lavas; the Deception Rhyolite of rhyolite flows, tuffs, and volcaniclastics, which interfinger with the Shea Basaslt; the Cleopatra Rhyolite of rhyolite flows, tuffs, and volcaniclastics; the Bullseye Rhyolite of dacite flows and volcaniclastics; and the Grapevine Gulch Formation mostly of fine-grained volcaniclastics interpreted as turbidites. Neither the base nor the top of the formation are exposed, but it is separated from the slightly younger Big Bug Group by the Shylock fault to the west. The formations are relatively undeformed by metamorphosis and show no foliation. Metamorphism has reached the greenschist facies.

The group was deposited in a deep oceanic island arc.

== Economic resources ==
The Ash Creek Group hosts numerous ore deposits, including the Jerome copper mine. Between 1883 and 1952, these produced 736,000 tons of copper and valuable amounts of gold, silver, lead, and zinc. The ore bodies are mostly found in the Cleopatra Rhyolite and the upper Deception Rhyolite. The ore bodies were emplaced in a hydrothermal system very shortly after deposition of the Cleopatra Rhyolite, about 1738.5 million years ago.

== History of investigation ==
The beds belonging to the unit were first named as the Ash Creek Group by C.A. Anderson and S.C. Creasey in 1958.
