= Aspen anomaly =

Geological structure below Colorado

Aspen anomaly is a geological structure in Colorado, United States. It consists of a low-seismic velocity anomaly in the mantle which underpins the highest sector of the Rocky Mountains.

== Characteristics ==
The Aspen anomaly is a seismic velocity anomaly in the mantle beneath central Colorado (in the region of Aspen, Colorado), which appears to reach down into the upper mantle. Helium with isotope ratios indicative of mantle origin emanates from the terrain above the anomaly.

The Aspen anomaly coincides with the highest region of the Rocky Mountains (such as the San Juan Mountains and the Sawatch Range) and divergent drainages (Arkansas River, Colorado River and Gunnison River) which have cut deep gorges. This region underwent significant uplift during the Cenozoic starting from 10-5 million years ago and was subsequently eroded by the Colorado River. Ongoing present-day uplift of the San Juan Mountains may be linked to the Aspen anomaly.

River knickpoints in Gore Canyon and Black Canyon may mark the point at which the rivers pass through the edge of the region above the anomaly. The Colorado River may be influenced by the anomaly all the way to Lees Ferry, Arizona.

Hot springs and geysers above the anomaly are a major source of carbon dioxide and other gases, some linked to chemolithotrophic bacterial communities. Cenozoic volcanism is also associated with the anomaly, such as potentially the Twin Lakes pluton close to Leadville, Colorado.

== Context ==
In seismic tomography images, the Aspen anomaly is characterized by a northwards tilted low seismic velocity anomaly. The anomaly is one among several low velocity anomalies beneath the western United States, although unlike the others known as the Jemez, Yellowstone and St. George it does not have a northeastward throw. Other structures that may be related to the Aspen anomaly are the Lester Mountain zone, the Colorado mineral belt and the Rio Grande Rift. The Aspen anomaly has been compared with the Yellowstone hotspot, but it lacks a volcanic caldera that Yellowstone has.

== Origin ==
The Aspen anomaly has been interpreted in several ways.

- It may be a mantle plume, but the steep tilt angle is unusual for a mantle plume.
- It may be a lithospheric melt zone, but the lithosphere is not thick enough to contain such a structure.
- It may be a Proterozoic structure, maybe the leftover of a subduction zone. Prolonged subduction would have enriched a segment of mantle with water and thus lowered its melting point.
- Shallower upwelling (such as asthenospheric upwelling), possibly linked with slab rollback or crustal delamination processes.
- Crustal weaknesses.
