= Wyoming Craton =

Craton in the west-central United States and western Canada

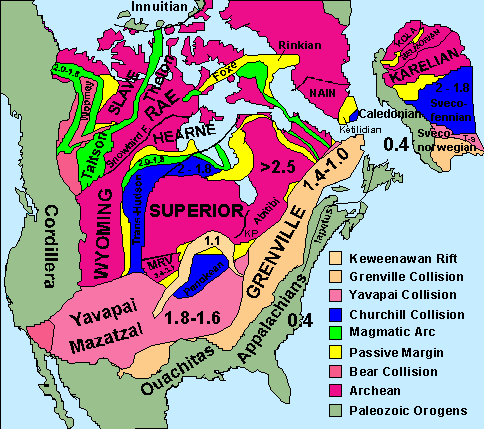
Trans-Hudson orogen (blue) surrounded by the Wyoming Hearne–Rae and Superior cratons (fuchsia) that constitute the central core of the North American Craton (Laurentia).

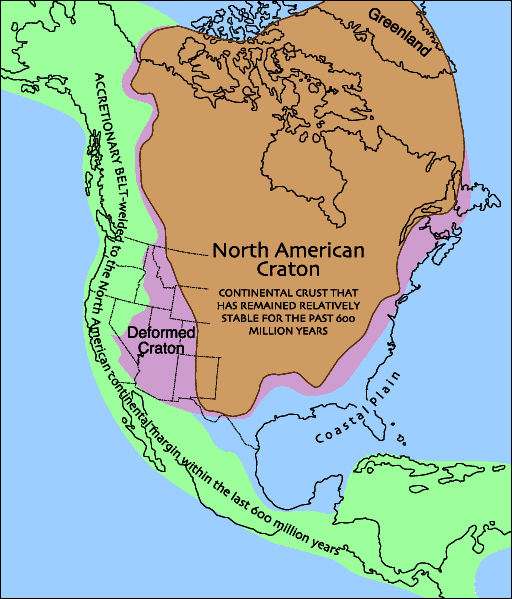
The North American Craton, also called Laurentia

The Wyoming Craton is a craton in United States and Canada – more specifically, in Montana, Wyoming, southern Alberta, and Utah. It is also called the Wyoming Province.

The Wyoming Craton was incorporated into southwest Laurentia approximately 1.86 billion years ago.

== Geologic summary ==
The Precambrian basement of Wyoming consists mainly of three major geologic terranes, the Archean Wyoming Craton or Province, the Paleoproterozoic Trans-Hudson orogen, and the Paleoproterozoic Colorado orogeny. The Colorado orogen collided with the Wyoming Craton at 1.78–1.75 Ga. Collision of the Colorado orogen and the Trans-Hudson orogen with the Archean craton produced strong structural overprinting along the southern and eastern margins of the Wyoming craton.

The Wyoming Craton consists mainly of two gross rock units—granitoid plutons (2.8–2.55 Ga) and gneiss and migmatite—together with subordinate (<10 percent) supracrustal metavolcanic-metasedimentary rocks. The granitoid rocks are mainly potassic granite and were derived principally from reworked older (3.1–2.8 Ga) gneiss. Magnetic contrast between the granitoid rocks and gneiss provides a means to map these gross rock units in covered areas. The overall structural pattern of the Archean units shown by magnetic data is crudely semi-circular and open to the north.

== Accretion events ==
During the Paleoproterozoic, island-arc terrane associated with the Colorado orogeny accreted to the Wyoming Craton along the Cheyenne belt, is an over 500-km-wide belt of Proterozoic rocks. As a result of the collision, older, Archean rocks of the Wyoming province were intensely deformed and metamorphosed for at least 75 km inboard from the suture, which is marked today by the Laramie Mountains. Along the east margin of the craton, collision with the Paleoproterozoic Trans-Hudson orogen intensely deformed Archean cratonic rocks in the Hartville uplift.

Mesoproterozoic (~1.4 Ga) anorthosite and syenites of the Laramie Anorthosite Complex and granite (ilmenite-bearing Sherman Granite) intrude into rocks of the Colorado orogen in the Laramie and adjacent Medicine Bow Mountains. Both the anorthosite and granite transect the Cheyenne belt in the Laramide Mountains, and intrude crystalline rocks of the Wyoming province. These intrusions comprise the northernmost segment of a wide belt of 1.4 Ga granitic intrusions that occur throughout the Colorado orogen.

Long after its assembly, the Wyoming Craton owes its spectacular mountainous terranes mainly to a regional episode of compressional deformation during the Laramide orogeny (ca.60 Ma). The basement blocks composed of Precambrian rocks were uplifted locally to high levels in the crust during the deformation, and subsequent erosion has molded the uplifted rocks into the rugged present-day topography. Vertical displacement of the basement surface was as much as 30,000 ft. (9250 m). By contrast, in western Wyoming thrust faulting, associated with the Sevier orogeny of approximately the same age, was thin-skinned, and the lack of disruption of magnetic anomalies in the region indicates that the basement rocks were little disturbed and not significantly uplifted during the thrusting. Even younger high-angle faulting of Pliocene–Pleistocene age has formed the Teton Range. Vertical relief on the east face of the mountains is about 25,000 ft. (7800 m).

== See also ==
- North American Craton
- Cheyenne belt
- Colorado orogeny
- Grouse Creek block located west of the craton
- Superior Craton
