= List of United States radio markets =

This is a list of radio station markets sorted in alphabetical order.

- Abilene
- Akron
- Albany
- Albany-Schenectady-Troy
- Albuquerque
- Alexandria
- Allentown-Bethlehem
- Altoona
- Amarillo
- Anchorage
- Ann Arbor
- Appleton-Oshkosh
- Asheville
- Aspen
- Atlanta
- Atlantic City-Cape May
- Augusta
- Augusta-Waterville
- Austin
- Bakersfield
- Baltimore
- Bangor
- Baton Rouge
- Battle Creek
- Beaumont-Port Arthur
- Beckley
- Bend
- Billings
- Biloxi-Gulfport-Pascagoula
- Binghamton
- Birmingham
- Bismarck
- Bloomington
- Bluefield
- Boise
- Boston
- Bowling Green
- Bridgeport
- Brunswick
- Bryan-College Station
- Buffalo-Niagara Falls
- Burlington-Plattsburgh
- Canton
- Cape Cod
- Casper
- Cedar Rapids
- Champaign
- Charleston, SC
- Charleston, WV
- Charlotte-Gastonia-Rock Hill
- Charlottesville
- Chattanooga
- Cheyenne
- Chicago
- Chico
- Cincinnati
- Clarksville-Hopkinsville
- Cleveland
- Clovis
- Colorado Springs
- Columbia, MO
- Columbia, SC
- Columbus, GA
- Columbus, OH
- Columbus-Starkville-West Point
- Concord (Lakes Region)
- Cookeville
- Corpus Christi
- Dallas-Ft. Worth
- Danbury
- Dayton
- Daytona Beach
- Decatur
- Denver-Boulder
- Des Moines
- Detroit
- Dothan
- Dubuque
- Duluth-Superior
- Eau Claire
- El Paso
- Elkins-Buckhannon-Weston
- Elmira-Corning
- Erie
- Eugene-Springfield
- Evansville
- Fargo-Moorhead
- Fayetteville (North West Arkansas)
- Fayetteville
- Flagstaff-Prescott
- Flint
- Florence
- Florence-Muscle Shoals
- Frederick
- Fredericksburg
- Fresno
- Ft. Collins-Greeley
- Ft. Myers-Naples-Marco Island
- Ft. Pierce-Stuart-Vero Beach
- Ft. Smith
- Ft. Walton Beach
- Ft. Wayne
- Gainesville-Ocala
- Grand Forks
- Grand Island-Kearney
- Grand Junction
- Grand Rapids
- Green Bay
- Greensboro-Winston-Salem-High Point
- Greenville-New Bern-Jacksonville
- Greenville-Spartanburg
- Hagerstown-Chambersburg-Waynesboro
- Harrisburg-Lebanon-Carlisle
- Harrisonburg
- Hartford-New Britain-Middletown
- Hilton Head
- Honolulu
- Hot Springs
- Houston-Galveston
- Huntington-Ashland
- Huntsville
- Indianapolis
- Ithaca
- Jackson, MS
- Jackson, TN
- Jacksonville
- Johnson City-Kingsport-Bristol
- Jonesboro
- Joplin
- Kalamazoo
- Kalispell-Flathead Valley
- Kansas City
- Killeen-Temple
- Knoxville
- La Crosse
- Lafayette, IN
- Lafayette, LA
- Lake Charles
- Lakeland-Winter Haven
- Lancaster
- Lansing-East Lansing
- Laredo
- Las Cruces
- Las Vegas
- LaSalle-Peru
- Laurel-Hattiesburg
- Lawton
- Lebanon-Rutland-White River Junction
- Lewiston-Auburn
- Lexington-Fayette
- Lima
- Lincoln
- Little Rock
- Los Angeles
- Louisville
- Lubbock
- Lufkin-Nacogdoches
- Macon
- Madison
- Manchester
- Mankato-New Ulm-St. Peter
- Marion-Carbondale (Southern IL)
- Mason City
- McAllen-Brownsville-Harlingen
- Medford-Ashland
- Melbourne-Titusville-Cocoa
- Memphis
- Merced
- Meridian
- Miami-Ft. Lauderdale-Hollywood
- Middlesex-Somerset-Union
- Milwaukee-Racine
- Minneapolis-St. Paul
- Mobile
- Modesto
- Monmouth-Ocean
- Monroe
- Monterey-Salinas-Santa Cruz
- Montgomery
- Montpelier-Barre-St. Johnsbury
- Morgantown-Clarksburg-Fairmont
- Morristown
- Muncie-Marion
- Muskegon
- Myrtle Beach
- Nashville
- Nassau-Suffolk (Long Island)
- New Bedford-Fall River
- New Haven
- New London
- New Orleans
- New York
- Newburgh-Middletown
- Norfolk-Virginia Beach-Newport News
- Odessa-Midland
- Oklahoma City
- Olean
- Omaha-Council Bluffs
- Orlando
- Oxnard-Ventura
- Palm Springs
- Panama City
- Parkersburg-Marietta
- Pensacola
- Peoria
- Philadelphia
- Phoenix
- Pittsburg
- Pittsburgh
- Portland, ME
- Portland, OR
- Portsmouth-Dover-Rochester
- Poughkeepsie
- Providence-Warwick-Pawtucket
- Pueblo
- Puerto Rico
- Quad Cities (Davenport-Rock Island-Moline)
- Raleigh-Durham
- Rapid City
- Reading
- Redding
- Reno
- Richmond
- Riverside-San Bernardino
- Roanoke-Lynchburg
- Rochester, MN
- Rochester, NY
- Rockford
- Rocky Mount-Wilson
- Sacramento
- Saginaw-Bay City-Midland
- Salina-Manhattan
- Salisbury-Ocean City
- Salt Lake City-Ogden-Provo
- San Angelo
- San Antonio
- San Diego
- San Francisco
- San Jose
- San Luis Obispo
- Santa Barbara
- Santa Fe
- Santa Maria-Lompoc
- Santa Rosa
- Sarasota-Bradenton
- Savannah
- Seattle-Tacoma
- Sebring
- Sheboygan
- Shreveport
- Sioux City
- South Bend
- Spokane
- Springfield, MA
- Springfield, MO
- St. Cloud
- St. Louis
- Stamford-Norwalk
- State College
- Stockton
- Sunbury-Selinsgrove-Lewisburg
- Sussex
- Syracuse
- Tallahassee
- Tampa-St. Petersburg-Clearwater
- Terre Haute
- Texarkana
- Toledo
- Topeka
- Traverse City-Petoskey
- Trenton
- Tri-Cities
- Tucson
- Tulsa
- Tupelo
- Tuscaloosa
- Twin Falls (Sun Valley)
- Tyler-Longview
- Utica-Rome
- Valdosta
- Victor Valley
- Visalia-Tulare-Hanford
- Waco
- Washington DC
- Waterloo-Cedar Falls
- Watertown
- Wausau-Stevens Point
- Wenatchee
- West Palm Beach-Boca Raton
- Wheeling
- Wichita
- Wichita Falls
- Wilkes Barre-Scranton
- Williamsport
- Wilmington, DE
- Wilmington, NC
- Winchester
- Worcester
- Yakima
- York
- Youngstown-Warren

== Additional markets ==
- Blacksburg-Christiansburg-Radford-Pulaski, VA
- The Florida Keys, FL
- Great Falls, MT
- Johnstown, PA
- Meadville-Franklin, PA
- Owensboro, KY
- Sioux Falls, SD
- Springfield, IL
- St. George-Cedar City, UT

== See also ==
- List of television stations in North America by media market
