= Cheyenne belt =

The Cheyenne Belt is the tectonic suture zone between the Archean-age Wyoming craton to the north and the Paleoproterozoic-age Yavapai province to the south. It runs through the southeastern quadrant of the state of Wyoming, United States. It was formed during the Paleoproterozoic Medicine Bow orogeny between 1.78 and 1.74 billion years ago when island arcs collided with the Wyoming craton. This is an example of a convergent boundary in tectonics.

== Description ==
The exposed geology consists of a series of northeast-striking, steeply-dipping shear zones. These separate Archean crust to the north from 1800-1600 million year old (Ma) to the south.

The Wyoming craton north of the belt is an Archean basement with a cover of younger miogeoclinal strata (sedimentary rock deposited on the passive margin of a continent.) The craton is intruded by dikes and sills of tholeiitic basalt with a minimum age of 2000 Ma, and this is taken as the time at which the Wyoming craton was rifted from a larger craton to produce the passive margin. The Yavapai province south of the belt contains no Archean crust, and it is intruded by granitoid rock with radiometric dates between 1780 and 1630 Ma. This province is interpreted as eugeoclinal rock (rock formed in an island arc). Additional granitoid intrusions that are 1400 Ma in age are interpreted as intrusions that took place after the Yavapai province was sutured to the Wyoming province.

The belt extends west but becomes poorly defined in the Great Basin. One reconstruction places the western extension of the Cheyenne belt just south of the Idaho-Utah and Idaho-Nevada border.

== Origin ==
The structure of the Cheyenne belt suggests that it is a deeply eroded master decollement. In other words, it exposes the contact between the subducting tectonic plate and the overriding tectonic place in a subduction zone. The question of which plate was the subducting plate is still a matter of research. Research during the 1980s suggested that the overriding plate was the Yavapai arc, based on the presence of calc-akaline intrusions (typical of volcanism in an overriding plate) in the Yavapai province. Further evidence is provided by the higher degree of metamorphism of rock on the Yavapai side of the decollement versus the Wyoming side, indicating that rock was brought upwards from greater depth along the decollement. However, more recent research calls this into question, suggesting either plate might have been the subducting plate but favoring subduction of the Yavapai plate beneath the Wyoming plate. This model is supported by isotopic evidence and by radiometric dates suggesting arc volcanism had ceased in the Yavapai island arc 20 million years before it accreted to the Wyoming plate.

The collision of the Yavapai arcs with the Wyoming craton began with in a mountain-building event from 1780 to 1750 Ma called the Medicine Bow orogeny.
