= Miogeocline =

Area of sedimentation along the passive margin of a continent

A miogeocline is an area of sedimentation which occurs along the passive margin of a continent. The deposits occur as typically shallow water clastic sediments which thicken seaward to form a clastic wedge parallel to a tectonically quiescent coast. Modern examples include the continental shelf of the northern Gulf of Mexico and the Atlantic coast of North and South America.

The term was coined in 1966 by Dietz and Holden from the miogeosyncline concept of the outdated geosynclinal theory. Dietz and Holden modified the term to miogeocline as the sedimentary deposits described were not synclinal in form.

Ancient miogeoclines such as the Neoproterozoic to Cambrian Cordilleran miogeocline of the southwestern U. S., the Paleozoic Appalachian miogeocline, the Precambrian Belt Supergroup of Montana and Idaho and the Huronian sediments of Canada which were involved in the Grenville Orogeny. The Devonian to Mississippian northern Cordilleran miogeocline of northern Yukon and Northwest Territories of Canada represents an area of current research in Arctic geology. The ancient miogeoclinal sediments become attached to or accreted onto the adjacent continent following later continental collisions or orogenies. Thus the sediments of the Appalachian miogeocline became part of the Appalachian Mountains during the Appalachian orogeny.
