= The Mad Trapper (1972 film) =

1972 British TV movie

- Theatrical poster
- Directed by: David Cobham
- Starring: Richard Alden; Joe Austin; Brandon Brady
- Country of origin: United Kingdom
- Original language: English

Production
- Production company: David Cobham Productions

Original release
- Release: 28 December 1972

The Mad Trapper is a 1972 British made-for-television docudrama film. The Mad Trapper is based on the 1931 Royal Canadian Mounted Police (RCMP) pursuit of a trapper named Albert Johnson, the reputed "Mad Trapper of Rat River".

A later film exploring the same topic was Challenge to Be Free (a.k.a. Mad Trapper of the Yukon and Mad Trapper) (1975) directed by Tay Garnett and stars Mike Mazurki. A later fictionalized account, Death Hunt (1981), also based on the story of the RCMP pursuit of Albert Johnson, was directed by Peter R. Hunt, and starred Charles Bronson, Lee Marvin, Angie Dickinson and Carl Weathers.

== Plot ==
In the Yukon, an American trapper (Del Henney) attempts to live in peace but is aware that other trappers resent his presence. When he is confronted by rival trappers, they bring along Millen (George R. Robertson), the local RCMP officer. Feeling intimidated, the trapper fights back, shooting his way out of his cabin, killing Millen and embarking on a desperate attempt to escape the authorities. The hazardous trek through the Arctic in the middle of winter becomes an epic manhunt, led by "Sarge" (Richard Alden). The RCMP eventually employ dog teams, radio and aircraft to bring down their prey.

== Cast ==
- Richard Alden as "Sarge" (Note: Richard Alden (born Alfred Alderdice), as an actor, was better known as Tom Drake.)
- Joe Austin as Ernie
- Brandon Brady as R.C.M.P. Carter
- Del Henney as The Mad Trapper
- Neil McCallum as Eames
- Dan McDonald as King
- George R. Robertson as Millen

== Production ==
The Mad Trapper was filmed mainly on location in the Yukon and Alaska, the same locales of the "Mad Trapper" manhunt.

== Reception ==
Reviewer Leonard Maltin noted (The) Mad Trapper was made in 1972 and was based on the story of "... a fur trapper pursued by the law in Arctic surroundings."
