= Lazarus Sittichinli =

Canadian Gwich'in elder

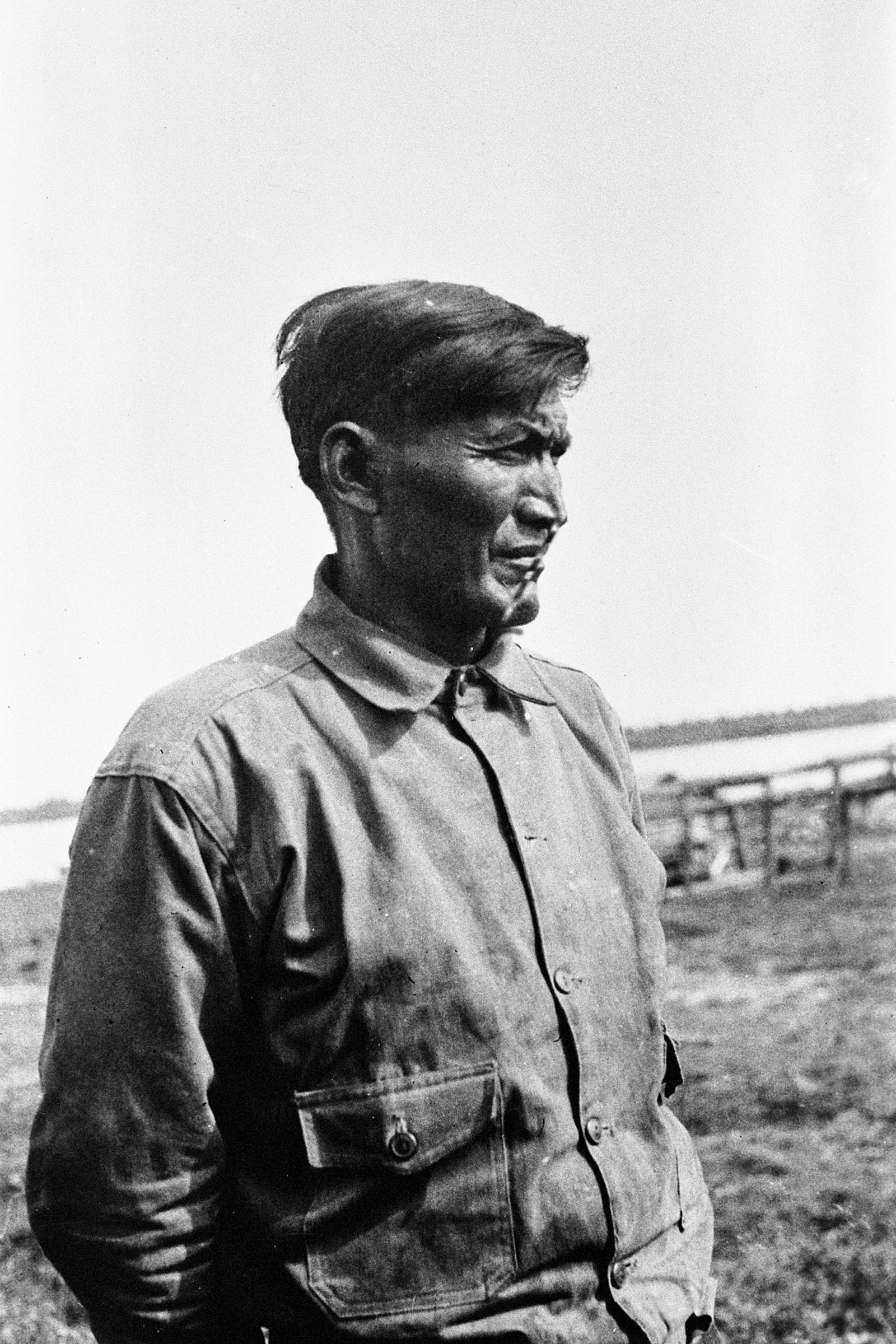
Sittichinli, c. 1940s

Lazarus Sittichinli was a First Nations elder of the Gwich'in people, who was the last surviving member of the man-hunt for the Mad Trapper of Rat River.

Oral histories he recorded have proved valuable in tying his people to their past.

Stephen Takfwi, Premier of the Northwest Territories, recorded a song celebrating Sittinchinli's life and example to his people.

When Rudy Wiebe interviewed Sittichinli for his 2011 book River of Stone, he wrote he was the only participant in the manhunt who was still alive.

Wiebe wrote that Sittichinli and his wife had been married for 67 years, and that 12 of their 14 children had predeceased them.

Cynthia Chambers Erasmus offered Sittichinli's testimony before the Berger Commission as an example of a key speech pattern of First Nations elders, in a journal article entitled "Ways with Stories: Listening to the Stories Aboriginal People Tell". She spent two pages deconstructing Sittichinli's testimony.
