= Wopmay orogen =

Mountain-building event in northern Canada

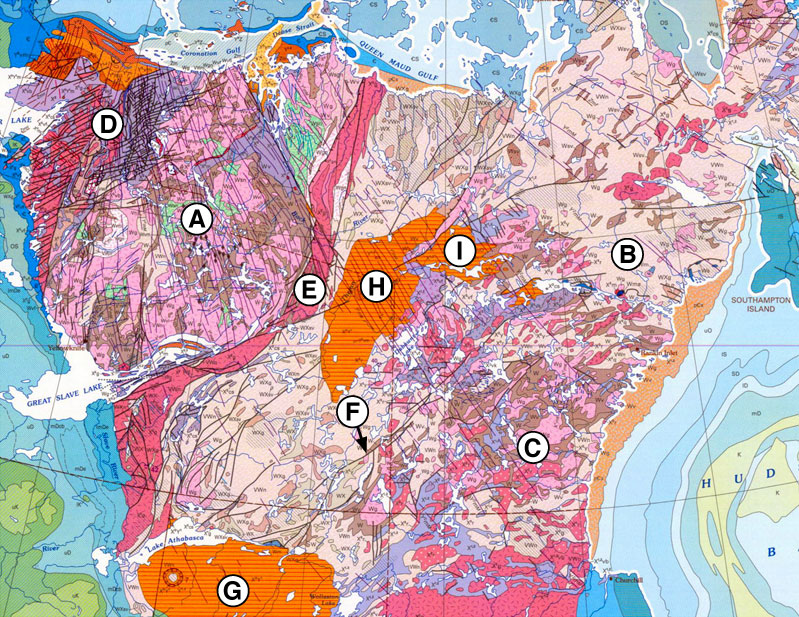
Geological map of north-western Canada. Wopmay orogen marked with D.

The Wopmay orogen is a Paleoproterozoic orogenic belt in northern Canada which formed during the collision between the Hottah terrane (north of the Hottah Lake), a continental magmatic arc, and the Archean Slave Craton at about 1.88 Ga (billion years). The collision led to the short-lived Calderian orogeny. The formation was named for Wilfrid Reid "Wop" May, OBE, DFC (April 20, 1896 – June 21, 1952), a Canadian flying ace in the First World War and a leading post-war aviator.

It is approximately 500 km along the north–south axis, and 200 km along the east–west axis at its widest point, tapering at both the northern and southern ends.

== Geological setting ==
The Wopmay orogen can be subdivided into (east to west): a passive continental margin, the Wopmay fault zone, the Great Bear magmatic zone, and the Hottah terrane. The passive margin developed around 1970–1890 Ma on top of the Slave Craton. The Wopmay fault zone is probably a suture between the Slave craton and the Hottah terrane. No Archean crust has been found west of this suture. The Great Bear magmatic zone resulted from arc magmatism around 1875–1840 Ma when these rocks were deposited and intruded into the Hottah terrane and Slave craton. The magmatic arc forms a 3–4.5 km thick basin overlying the Hottah-Slave transition. The cryptic Hottah terrane is a magmatic arc which consists of a 1936–1890 Ma-old suite of plutons intruded into 2.0–2.4 Ga metamorphosed sedimentary and volcanic rocks. It probably extends east beneath the Great Bear magmatic zone.

== Tectonic evolution ==
The Wopmay orogen formed 1882±4 Ma when the Coronation paleocean (named after the Arctic Coronation Gulf) closed between the western margin of the Slave craton and Hottah terrane. The Great Bear magmatic arc remained active 1.88–1.84 Ga while subduction still occurred and bisects the Hottah terrane north to south. The Coronation margin final closure occurred at 1.74 Ga. The date for the opening of the Coronation Ocean is uncertain, but isotopic studies indicate that initial rifting must be older than about 1.97 Ga. The Hottah arc formed 2.4–2.0 Ga on cryptic crust, probably coeval with sedimentation of the Coronation margin. The closure of Coronation Ocean saw an initial phase of westward-directed subduction of oceanic crust beneath the Hottah terrane. This process was followed by an interrupted eastward subduction around 1.885 Ga during which the Coronation margin and Hottah terrane were translated eastward and partially thrust over the Slave craton.

== Significance ==
Sites like the Wopmay Orogen provide evidence for early and ongoing plate tectonics. Traces of old oceanic crust, island arcs, and colliding continents indicate that the same forces at work today have been at work in the early Proterozoic and probably earlier. Alignments of magnetic particles in rocks demonstrate that continents were drifting across the surface of the Earth relative to the magnetic poles then as now, and that the ocean floor was rifting and subducting, all at least 1.5 billion years ago. This crust cycling is referred to as the supercontinent cycle.
