= Challenge to Be Free =

1975 film

- Theatrical poster
- Directed by: Tay Garnett
- Written by: Anne Bosworth; Chuck D. Keen
- Based on: story by Dick North
- Produced by: Chuck D. Keen
- Starring: Mike Mazurki
- Narrated by: John McIntire
- Cinematography: Chuck D. Keen
- Music by: Ian Bernard
- Distributed by: Pacific International Enterprises
- Release date: November 5, 1975
- Running time: 88 minutes
- Country: United States
- Language: English
- Box office: $7.5 million

Challenge to Be Free (a.k.a. Mad Trapper of the Yukon and Mad Trapper) is an anti-hero film directed by Tay Garnett and starring Mike Mazurki. The film's plot was a loosely based on the 1931 Royal Canadian Mounted Police (RCMP) pursuit of a trapper named Albert Johnson, the reputed "Mad Trapper of Rat River". The film was shot and originally released in 1972 with the title Mad Trapper of the Yukon; it was re-released in 1975 as Challenge to Be Free.

Another film exploring the same topic was The Mad Trapper (1972), a British made-for-television production. A later fictionalized account, Death Hunt (1981), also based on the story of the RCMP pursuit of Albert Johnson, was directed by Peter R. Hunt and starred Charles Bronson, Lee Marvin, Angie Dickinson, and Carl Weathers.

== Plot ==
In the Canada's Northwest Territories, Trapper attempts to live in harmony with nature but is aware that other trappers are using inhumane trapping techniques. When he is confronted by a rival trapper over his interference with their trap line, they bring along Sargent, the local police officer. Feeling intimidated, Trapper fights back, shooting his way out of his cabin and embarking on a desperate attempt to escape the authorities.

== Cast ==
- Mike Mazurki as Trapper
- Fritz Ford as Sargent
- Vic Christy as Frenchy
- Jimmy Kane as "Old Tracks"
- Alex Van Bibber as Great Rifleman
- Gordon Yardley as Supply Officer
- Bob McKinnon as Buck Dawson
- Roger Reitano as Eli Zane
- Ted Yardley as Officer Cabot
- Brian Russell as Storekeeper
- Connie Yardley as Housewife
- John McIntire as the narrator
- Patty Piper as Indian
- Tay Garnett as Old Marshall McGee

== Production ==
Challenge to Be Free was filmed mainly on location in Alaska. As an American production, Johnson's character was changed to simply "Trapper". The theme song "Trapper Man" was featured. It was filmed and originally released with little promotion as The Mad Trapper of the Yukon in 1972. In 1975, the title was changed and the film was given a wider release, primarily marketed towards younger audiences.

== Reception ==
Reviewer Leonard Maltin characterized Challenge to Be Free as being "... A very charming film, wonderful for younger viewers."

== See also ==
- List of American films of 1975
- List of American films of 1972
