= John F. Burnett =

American film editor (1934–2024)

- Born: John Forbes Burnett; March 5, 1934; Kansas City, Missouri, U.S.
- Died: October 24, 2024 (aged 90); Lincoln, California, U.S.
- Occupation: Film editor
- Years active: 1968–2024

John Forbes Burnett (March 5, 1934 – October 24, 2024) was an American film editor.

Burnett died in Lincoln, California on October 24, 2024, at the age of 90.

At the 97th Academy Awards, his name was mentioned in the In Memoriam section.

== Filmography ==
Editor
Year	Film	Director	Notes
1968	The Heart Is a Lonely Hunter	Robert Ellis Miller	First collaboration with Robert Ellis Miller
1970	Suppose They Gave a War and Nobody Came	Hy Averback	
1970	The Owl and the Pussycat	Herbert Ross	First collaboration with Herbert Ross
1971	Wild Rovers	Blake Edwards	Second collaboration with Blake Edwards
1972	The Culpepper Cattle Co.	Dick Richards	
1973	The Way We Were	Sydney Pollack	
1974	The Girl from Petrovka	Robert Ellis Miller	Second collaboration with Robert Ellis Miller
1975	The Sunshine Boys	Herbert Ross	Second collaboration with Herbert Ross
1976	Murder by Death	Robert Moore	
1977	The Domino Principle	Stanley Kramer	
1977	The Goodbye Girl	Herbert Ross	Third collaboration with Herbert Ross
1978	Grease	Randal Kleiser	
1979	...And Justice for All	Norman Jewison	
1980	Can't Stop the Music	Nancy Walker	
1981	Death Hunt	Peter Hunt	
1981	Rich and Famous	George Cukor	Second collaboration with George Cukor
1982	Grease 2	Patricia Birch	
1984	Irreconcilable Differences	Charles Shyer	
1986	A Fine Mess	Blake Edwards	Third collaboration with Blake Edwards
1989	Leviathan	George P. Cosmatos	
1991	Bed & Breakfast	Robert Ellis Miller	Third collaboration with Robert Ellis Miller
1992	Class Act	Randall Miller	
1992	Leap of Faith	Richard Pearce	

Editorial department
Year	Film	Director	Role	Notes	Other notes
1957	The Spirit of St. Louis	Billy Wilder	Assistant editor		Uncredited
1957	The Helen Morgan Story	Michael Curtiz	Assistant editor		Uncredited
1958	Fort Dobbs	Gordon Douglas	Assistant editor		Uncredited
1959	The FBI Story	Mervyn LeRoy	Assistant editor	First collaboration with Mervyn LeRoy	Uncredited
1960	Cash McCall	Joseph Pevney	Assistant editor		Uncredited
1960	Tall Story	Joshua Logan	Assistant editor		Uncredited
1962	The Music Man	Morton DaCosta	Assistant editor		Uncredited
1962	Gypsy	Mervyn LeRoy	Assistant editor	Second collaboration with Mervyn LeRoy	Uncredited
1964	My Fair Lady	George Cukor	Assistant editor	First collaboration with George Cukor	Uncredited
1965	The Great Race	Blake Edwards	Additional editor	First collaboration with Blake Edwards	Uncredited
1966	Who's Afraid of Virginia Woolf?	Mike Nichols	Assistant editor		Uncredited
1978	Moment by Moment	Jane Wagner	Supervising film editor		
1983	Staying Alive	Sylvester Stallone	Editor		

Thanks
Year	Film	Director	Role
1997	Traveller	Jack N. Green	Thanks

Documentaries

Thanks
Year	Film	Director	Role
2017	The Fabulous Allan Carr	Jeffrey Schwarz	Special thanks

TV movies

Editor
Year	Film	Director
1975	Love Among the Ruins	George Cukor
1975	Promise Him Anything	Edward Parone
1986	Between Two Women	Jon Avnet
1991	Fourth Story	Ivan Passer
1993	Killer Rules	Robert Ellis Miller
1994	Pointman	Robert Ellis Miller

Editorial department
Year	Film	Director	Role
1985	Surviving	Waris Hussein	Supervising editor
1991	Not of This World	Jon Hess	Supervising editor

TV series

Editor
Year	Title	Notes
1983	The Winds of War	7 episodes
1988−89	War and Remembrance	12 episodes
1996−97	Baywatch Nights	10 episodes

Producer
Year	Title	Credit	Notes
1995	Pointman	Co-executive producer; Co-producer	21 episodes
1995−97	Baywatch Nights	Producer	44 episodes
