= Great Bear magmatic zone =

Coordinates: 64°52′N 116°31′W

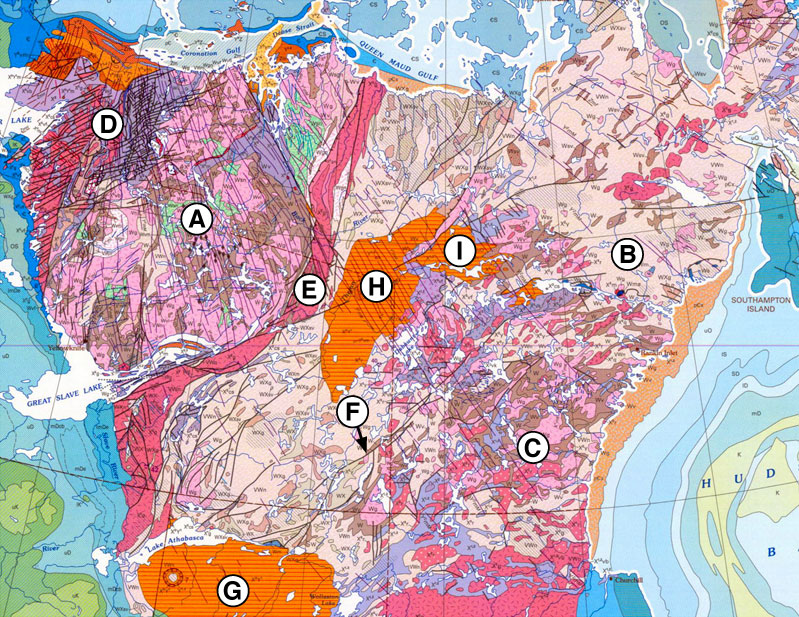
- Geological map of northwestern Canada. The Wopmay orogen is D; the Great Bear magmatic zone is the red area stretching from the northern tip of Great Slave Lake to the eastern shore of Great Bear Lake.

Geography
- Location: Northwest Territories, Canada

The Great Bear magmatic zone (GBMZ) is a Paleoproterozoic (1.875–1.86 Ga) multi-collisional orogenic belt of which 100 km × 400 km (62 mi × 249 mi) is exposed in the northwestern Canadian Shield east of Great Bear Lake, Northwest Territories.

Covering 40,000 km^{2} (15,000 sq mi), the GBMZ forms part of the Wopmay orogen together with the Coronation margin and Hottah terrane and overlies these two tectonic elements. The GBMZ, in turn, is covered by Paleozoic and Proterozoic sediments and, as indicated by a long aeromagnetic line, the sub-aerial part of the GMBZ is probably 800 km (500 mi) long. Volcanic rocks of the GBMZ range from basalt to rhyolite and geologic studies show it is part of an early Proterozoic continental volcanic arc.

== Geologic history ==
The GBMZ formed following a flip in subduction polarity from east to west dipping when the Hottah terrane collided with the Slave Craton 1.875–1.855 Ga.

The GBMZ is a magmatic arc on the western margin of the Wopmay orogen which developed 1.875–1.840 Ga on older Proterozoic basement rocks. The medial or internal zone of the orogen form the eastern margin of the GBMZ and is marked by the complex Wopmay fault zone which the GBMZ partly covers in the north.

The early history of the GBMZ (1.870–1.865 Ga) was dominated by volcanism and intrusions that produced a stratum of volcanic rocks 10 km (6.2 mi) thick in the north to 5 km (3.1 mi) in the south. The volcanic layers in the north are folded and have been intruded by quartz monzonite plutons. Large granite batholiths were emplaced during late stages of volcanism (1.865–1.840 Ga). The GBMZ at this stage is thought to be the result of eastward-directed subduction of oceanic lithosphere.

This was followed by a collision with a microcontinent in the west. A system of brittle faults developed, the most prominent of which form a set of north-east-trending right-lateral faults with a length varying from hundred metres to several kilometres. Topographically the GBMZ is characterised by granitic low relief areas with former volcanoes forming 150 m (490 ft)-high hills.

Several plate tectonic reconstructions propose an Archean-Paleoproterozoic connection between the cratonic core of North America, the continent Laurentia, and that of Siberia, the continent Siberia, based on geological connections and paleomagnetic evidence. For example, in the reconstruction of Rainbird et al. 1998 Angara in Siberia matches the Wopmay orogen and the GBMZ in Laurentia; and the Aktikan fold belt in Siberia matches the Thelon-Taltson belt in Laurentia. Several other tectonic models have been proposed, however, and the possible connections between the two early continents remain controversial.

== Commercial geology ==
A filled in lava tube next to a feeder dike at Great Bear Lake

The GBMZ hosts polymetallic and iron-oxide-rich deposits many of which include magnetite–apatite–actinolite veins, making the GBMZ attractive for IOCG exploration.

== See also ==
- Taltson magmatic zone
- Volcanism of Northern Canada
