= David Pisurayak Kootook =

Inuk boy (1958–1972)

Coordinates: 65°04′01″N 118°30′06″W

Main sites

David Pisurayak Kootook, MSC, (August 13, 1958 – December 1, 1972) was an Inuk boy from Spence Bay, Northwest Territories (now Nunavut) who helped save the life of bush pilot Marten Hartwell after a crash in the Canadian Arctic. Kootook died after 23 days, and was posthumously awarded the Meritorious Service Cross.

== The crash ==
Kootook had appendicitis and was being medically evacuated from Cambridge Bay for treatment. The plane hit a hill near Hottah Lake, just south of Great Bear Lake and 400 km (250 mi) northwest of Yellowknife. Both Kootook and Marten survived the crash, but the two other people on board, a pregnant Inuk woman and a nurse attending them, died. Hartwell, the pilot, broke both ankles as a result of the impact and was therefore immobile. The temperature was as low as -40 °C (-40 °F). Kootook, 14 years old at the time, built a shelter for both of them, lit and tended a fire, and found food for himself and the pilot. Hartwell eventually ate the flesh of a deceased passenger, but Kootook declined and died of starvation after 23 days. In an inquiry, doctors determined he would have survived if he had not used all his energy for his heroic efforts.

Hartwell was rescued by the Canadian military a week later.

== Memorials and legacy ==
The story of the crash and the following events were written about in Edmonton author Peter Tadman's book The Survivor.

The story of Hartwell's survival, with emphasis on the role played by Kootook, are related in "The Marten Hartwell Story" by Canadian balladeer Stompin' Tom Connors. In the lyrics Kootook is referred to several times as an "Eskimo boy" and later by name in the line "Davey Kootook died a saint and a credit to his people".

In 1972 Kiviaq proposed that either the new colisseum or football stadium planned to be built in Edmonton should be named after Kootook. However, this motion was not passed by Edmonton's city council.

The Meritorious Service Cross was awarded to Kootook's family in 1994, 22 years after his death, for his efforts to save Hartwell's life. The honour is awarded for "a deed or an activity that has been performed in an outstandingly professional manner, or with uncommonly high standards."

In 1998, Kootook was honoured by the Northern Transportation Company by having a ship named after him.

There is also a memorial Inuksuk in honour of Kootook in Edmonton.
