= Hottah terrane =

Paleoproterozoic terrane in the northwestern end of the Canadian Shield

The Hottah terrane is a Paleoproterozoic terrane in the northwestern end of the Canadian Shield which is exposed near Hottah Lake, Northwest Territories. It is a belt of multi-deformed metasedimentary and metavolcanic rocks intruded by a series of diorite to granite plutons. Forming the western part of the Wopmay orogenic system, the 1.9 Ga (billion years ago) Hottah terrane is separated from the Archean rocks of the orogen by the north-trending Wopmay fault zone and overprinted by the 1.875–1.85 Ga Great Bear magmatism.

== Tectonic history ==
The Hottah terrane is a proposed microcontinent, which collided with the Archean Slave Craton at ca. 1.88 Ga after which the westward subduction of an ancient ocean in front of the Slave Craton ceased and the Great Bear magmatic zone formed.

This view was, however, challenged by Ootes et al. 2015. In their model, the Hottah terrane was detached from the Slave Craton south of its present location (in modern coordinates) and made a northward voyage along an active margin similar to that of Baja California Peninsula and its chain of volcanoes. The Hottah terrane, according to their dating evidence, share the same tectonic history as several domains south and east of it, domains that were tied to the Slave Craton ca. 1.97 Ga. The active margin in which the Hottah terrane was born began at ca. 2.0 Ga and lasted until ca. 1.85 Ga. During this period the terrane was transported laterally along the subduction system before colliding with the Slave Craton ca. 1.88 Ga. Renewed eastward subduction then resulted in the volcanism of the Great Bear magmatic arc ca. 1.876–1.869 Ga while plutonism lasted until ca. 1.855 Ga.
