= Marten Hartwell =

Canadian bush pilot (1925–2013)

Coordinates: 65°04′01″N 118°30′06″W

Marten Hartwell (1925 – April 2, 2013) was a German-Canadian bush pilot in the Canadian Arctic. On November 8, 1972, the plane that Hartwell was flying on a medical evacuation with 3 other passengers crashed. One passenger, a nurse named Judy Hill, was killed on impact. A pregnant Inuk woman who was being evacuated also died shortly after the crash. Hartwell himself was left with two broken ankles and could not walk. One passenger, a boy, David Pisurayak Kootook, survived the initial crash along with Hartwell but died after 23 days. Kootook spent his last few weeks gathering food and keeping a fire for himself and the injured pilot and is credited with saving Hartwell's life. The pilot was rescued after 31 days. Since the pilot was injured and unable to obtain local food, and emergency rations had run out, the pilot was forced to consume flesh from one of the dead passengers. At the time of his death he lived at Black River, Kings, Nova Scotia.

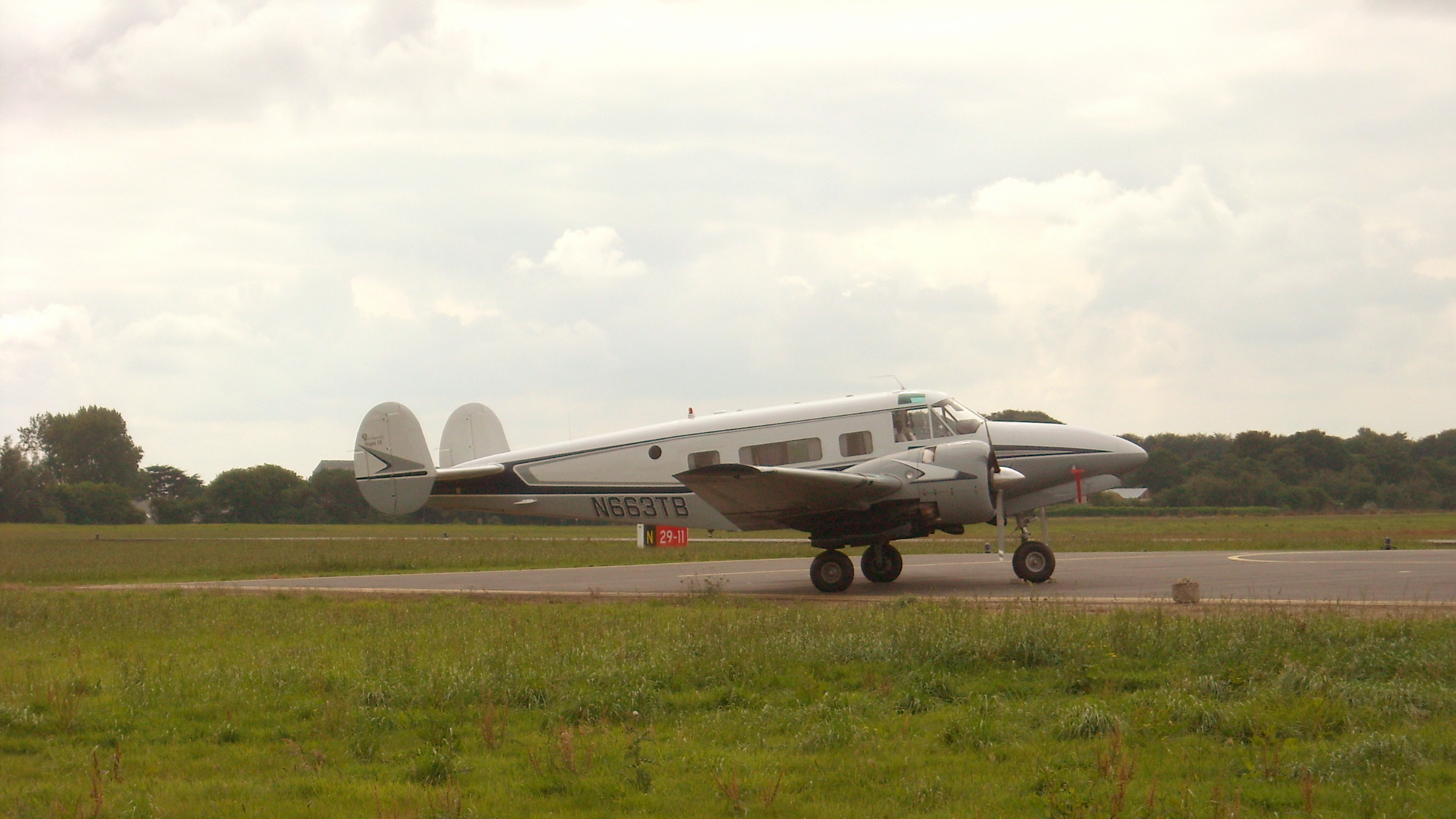
A Beech 18, similar to the incident aircraft C-FRLD.

== Biography ==
Leopold Herrmann, born in 1925 in Germany, was given military flight training in 1944, In 1958 he obtained a West German pilot's licence and emigrated to Canada in 1967. He was in the process of legally changing his name to Marten Hartwell at the time of the accident. He died on April 2, 2013, at the age of 88.

== Crash ==
Departure (Cambridge Bay), crash site (Hottah Lake) and destination (Yellowknife)

On November 8, 1972, Hartwell was given a charter to fly from Cambridge Bay, Northwest Territories (now Nunavut) with three passengers who had just arrived from Spence Bay; a pregnant Inuk woman named Neemee Nulliayok, a 14-year-old Inuk boy named David Pisurayak Kootook (who was suffering from appendicitis), and an attending government nurse named Judy Hill. Hartwell was not flying a normal scheduled route, but happened to be in Cambridge Bay after dropping off prospectors on the Barrens. His aircraft, a Gateway Aviation Beechcraft 18, was chartered by the nurse in Cambridge Bay to fly on to Yellowknife where his passengers could receive medical care at the local hospital.

After leaving Cambridge Bay Airport during very bad weather conditions, Hartwell's plane traveled about 700 km (430 mi) before crashing into a hillside near Hottah Lake, southeast of Great Bear Lake. The nurse, Judy Hill was killed on impact. The Inuk woman died several hours later. Hartwell and the young boy survived the crash, although both of Hartwell's ankles, his left knee and his nose were fractured. For weeks the two survived the brutally harsh weather where the average temperature was −37 °C (−35 °F). Kootook was instrumental in the pair's survival by erecting a tent and making fires. He died after the 20th day whereupon the pilot survived by eating part of the leg of the nurse.

== Search ==
The initial search, which lasted three weeks, failed to find any trace of the Hartwell plane and was called off. After a three day pause the search was reopened by the Minister of Defence, James Richardson, and Hartwell was found alive 31 days after the crash. The search cost about one million Canadian dollars, the most costly search and rescue operation in Canadian aviation history to that date.

Pressure to resume the search came from Susan Haley of the University of Alberta, Edmonton and her father, Dr Haley of Acadia University, Nova Scotia. The search resumed in difficult conditions. There were less than six hours of daylight and temperatures were 10 to 20 below zero out on the barrenlands. The resumed search did not find the lost plane. The plane was found after a Hercules aircraft of the Canadian Armed Forces on a return trip from the Inuvik Supplementary Radio Station (CFS Inuvik) picked up an emergency signal from the aircraft's emergency radio beacon on December 7, 1972. According to a speech given in 2011 by General Ramsey Muir Withers, the beacon had not been turned on until 30 days after the crash. Three aircraft were dispatched to the area and on December 8 the crash site was located. Paratroopers were dropped and a helicopter was sent to pick up Hartwell.

== Inquiry ==
The international interest in the loss of the plane was demonstrated by the sudden arrival in Yellowknife of the international press corps. Hartwell gave a lengthy interview to the Observer after his rescue, but did not cooperate in any attempt to portray the story in film or on television.

Although Hartwell refused to attend the Yellowknife inquest into the loss of the plane and its passengers a lot of evidence about Hartwell was presented to the Yellowknife inquest. The inquest was told that members of the Royal Canadian Mounted Police (RCMP) who inspected Hartwell's camp had found small plastic bags containing human remains. Hartwell greeted his rescuers by saying: "Welcome to the camp of a cannibal." At the crash scene he left a note for his son Peer. The note was translated by Gerry Reimann of Yellowknife and was read into the inquest record. The note said:

When you receive this letter, I will be dead. I have had an accident on Nov. 8/72 and I am still laying in the bush with broken legs. Have no more food. Please forgive me for sins. I love you, my only son. Please contact Miss Susan Haley c/o Department of Philosophy, U of A, Edmonton, Alberta. She was, for the past year and a half, a close companion. An even better address may be: Miss Susan Haley c/o Dr Haley, University of Wolfville, N.S., Wolfville, Nova Scotia, Canada. There are savings in the Imperial Bank of Commerce here in Yellowknife and Edmonton. You should have $3,000 and Susan the rest that she may pay my debts and the unpaid ones with court. I am wishing you all the best and remember me. In my heart I was not all that bad.

A warned statement, obtained by an RCMP officer from Hartwell, was read into the inquest record. David Kootook survived living off tree bark. He refused to eat any of Judy Hill's flesh. He died about a week before Hartwell was rescued. Two paramedics were parachuted into the crash scene. Hartwell was first taken to Stanton Yellowknife Hospital where he was said to be relatively good condition after his ordeal.

An accident investigation report was released by the Air Accident Investigation Branch of the Ministry of Transport on July 3, 1973. Among its findings were that the pilot had not been qualified for night instrument flight, and that Gateway Aviation (his employer) did not have adequate supervision or policies for its visual flight rules pilots.

Hartwell's pilot's licence was suspended for a time after the incident. He returned to northern flying and settled at Fort Norman and started his own aviation company. He was involved in a second crash in October 1987 but walked out after two days; there were no fatalities. Hartwell retired from flying after selling his company in 1991.

== Legacy ==
The story of Hartwell's survival, with emphasis on the role played by Kootook, are related in "The Marten Hartwell Story" by Canadian balladeer Stompin' Tom Connors. Connors' song does not contain any reference to the cannibalism aspects of the incident.

In 1998 David Pisuriak Kootook, the Inuk boy from Taloyoak who saved the downed pilot, was honoured by the Northern Transportation Company by having a ship named after him. He was also awarded, posthumously in 1994, the Meritorious Service Cross, which is awarded for "a deed or an activity that has been performed in an outstandingly professional manner, or with uncommonly high standards."

The Spence Bay nurse, Judy Hill, was born at Kingsbridge, England. Judy Hill's mother was a matron at a local hospital. In 1977 a BBC reporter, Jim McDougall, published a book titled Angel of the Snow about Judy Hill. According to McDougall a Judy Hill Memorial Fund was organised and contributions was made from around the world. The money is used to help in the training of nurses.

McDougall says that Neemee and David were buried in a private plot in Edmonton. Judy Hill's body was taken to Banff where she was cremated and her ashes were scattered by Judy's boyfriend Chris at a quiet place on the Bow River.

== See also ==
- List of incidents of cannibalism
