= Death Hunt =

1981 film by Peter R. Hunt

- Theatrical release poster by John Solie
- Directed by: Peter Hunt
- Written by: Michael Grais and Mark Victor
- Produced by: Murray Shostak
- Starring: Charles Bronson; Lee Marvin; Andrew Stevens; Carl Weathers; Ed Lauter; Angie Dickinson
- Cinematography: James Devis
- Edited by: John F. Burnett; Allan Jacobs
- Music by: Jerrold Immel
- Production company: Golden Harvest
- Distributed by: 20th Century Fox (worldwide); Golden Harvest (Hong Kong)
- Release date: May 21, 1981
- Running time: 97 minutes
- Countries: United States; Hong Kong
- Language: English
- Budget: $10.5 million
- Box office: $5 million

Death Hunt (also known as Yukon in West Germany) is a 1981 Western action film directed by Peter Hunt. The film stars Charles Bronson, Lee Marvin, Angie Dickinson, Carl Weathers, Maury Chaykin, Ed Lauter and Andrew Stevens. Death Hunt was a fictionalized account of the Royal Canadian Mounted Police (RCMP) pursuit of a man named Albert Johnson. Earlier films exploring the same topic were The Mad Trapper (1972), a British made-for-television production and Challenge to Be Free (also known as Mad Trapper of the Yukon and Mad Trapper) (1975).

== Plot ==
In the Yukon Territory in 1931, Albert Johnson (Charles Bronson), a solitary American trapper, comes across an organized dog fight. A white German Shepherd named Sitka is badly injured and Johnson forces $200 on its owner, a vicious trapper named Hazel (Ed Lauter), in exchange for the dog. Johnson nurses the dog back to health.

Claiming the dog was stolen from him, Hazel leads several friends to Johnson's isolated cabin to retrieve it. In the ensuing shoot-out, Sitka is shot and Johnson kills Jimmy Tom (Denis Lacroix). The others learn Johnson bought 700 rounds of ammunition from the local trading post and paid in $100 bills, concluding he is a mythical "mad trapper", a psychopathic serial killer who preys on other trappers and takes their gold teeth. When an old trapper, Bill Luce (Henry Beckman), warns Johnson the law is coming for him, he fortifies his cabin.

Sergeant Edgar Millen (Lee Marvin), commander of the local Royal Canadian Mounted Police post, reluctantly agrees to investigate Hazel's accusations that Johnson stole his dog and murdered Jimmy Tom. His posse of mounties and trappers includes veteran tracker "Sundog" Brown (Carl Weathers), a young constable, Alvin Adams (Andrew Stevens), and a new lover in Vanessa McBride (Angie Dickinson). The posse arrives at the fortified cabin and when Millen parleys with Johnson, one of the trappers opens fire, trigging a shoot-out. Several men are killed and the posse blows up the cabin with dynamite. Johnson kills Constable Hawkins (Jon Cedar) as he makes his escape.

Millen, Sundog, Adams, and Hazel with his tracker dogs set off after Johnson along with trappers seeking the $1,000 bounty that has been placed on Johnson's life. Captain Hank Tucker (Scott Hylands), a Royal Canadian Air Force pilot, joins the hunt, which has garnered international press attention and is considered a national embarrassment. Hylands reveals that Johnson was a member of a United States Army special intelligence unit during World War I.

Johnson expertly uses tracking techniques to avoid Millen's posse and the bounty hunters, living off the land in treacherous winter conditions. Millen begins to respect Johnson's uncommon abilities, while growing to resent the intrusion of so many outsiders. Luce comes across two of the pursuing trappers and shoots them both dead before pulling out their gold teeth, revealing himself as the mad trapper.

The pursuers catch up to Johnson, and Sundog is killed when Tucker strafes the area indiscriminately with his aircraft machine gun. Millen and Adams angrily shoot down the aircraft with their rifles, killing Tucker. Johnson escapes after killing Hazel.

Luce encounters Johnson who captures him at gunpoint. Millen catches up to the pair and opens fire, killing one of them with a bullet to the face. The unrecognizable corpse is wearing Johnson's clothes, but they spot Johnson escaping in Luce's clothes and realize they switched. Millen passes control of the pursuit to Adams and leaves. Fresh pursuers arrive and Adams tells them that Millen has killed Johnson. A trapper searches the corpse and finds a pocket full of gold teeth. The posse celebrates the killing of the "mad trapper" as Johnson retreats back into the mountains.

== Cast ==
- Charles Bronson as Albert Johnson
- Lee Marvin as Sergeant Edgar Millen
- Andrew Stevens as Constable Alvin Adams
- Carl Weathers as George Washington Lincoln "Sundog" Brown
- Ed Lauter as Hazel
- Scott Hylands as Captain Hank Tucker
- Angie Dickinson as Vanessa McBride
- Henry Beckman as Bill Luce
- William Sanderson as Ned Warren
- Jon Cedar as Constable Hawkins
- James O'Connell as Hurley
- Len Lesser as Lewis
- Maury Chaykin as Clarence
- August Schellenberg as Deak De Bleargue
- Dick Davalos as Beeler
- Denis Lacroix as Jimmy Tom
- Tantoo Cardinal as Indian Woman

== Production ==
A Bristol F.2 Fighter replica featured prominently in Death Hunt.

=== Development ===
The film was financed by Raymond Chow of Hong Kong's Golden Harvest. It was part of a six film slate worth $60 million he announced in July 1979, others including High Road to China, The Cannonball Run, and Battle Creek Brawl, plus two films that were not made, The Texans directed by Sam Peckinpah from a script by John Milius, and Horizons based on a novel by Hardy Kruger. The latter film was financed with German tax shelter money.

Chow sold the film to 20th Century Fox.

The film was originally known as Arctic Rampage. Bronson and Marvin had first worked together on You're in the Navy Now (1951). Marvin later said "Sometimes during 'Death Hunt,' I'd look over at him [Bronson], and think, 'Well, here we are, still at it, and we've held up well.' It's unusual to be able to feel that way about an old mate. Usually, you meet some actor you've known for years and you are guilty about your own success. It's, 'Gee, I've had the breaks, what the hell can I say?' And the other guy starts talking about his bad timing. 'If I'd been there, Brando never would have made it'."

=== Historical accuracy ===
Death Hunt bears little resemblance to the true story of the manhunt of Albert Johnson, the reputed "Mad Trapper of Rat River". Johnson was eventually killed after a remarkable and highly publicized pursuit over several weeks. Of special note was that Johnson eluded his RCMP pursuers in the dead of winter in the lower Arctic, crossing the Richardson Mountains in the process, a feat previously considered impossible. On February 17, 1932, Johnson was finally surrounded by Mounties on the frozen Eagle River and shot and killed.

"Albert Johnson was a hero in that he survived a physical ordeal," said the film's producer Murray Shostak. "The story isn't twisted. We're not making a documentary."

World War I veteran Wop May was a bush pilot flying a Bellanca aircraft who was involved in the hunt for Johnson. Contrary to the film, May, who was portrayed as "Captain Tucker", did not wildly shoot at everyone, including the posse on the ground, nor did he get shot down. May was unscathed and lived until 1952. "There was no heavy so we elected to make it the airplane," said producer Al Ruddy. "It represents the twentieth century."

In the film numerous men are shot and killed by Johnson, but during the real manhunt this never occurred. Constable Millen was shot and killed by Johnson and was the only police officer killed by Johnson during the manhunt. Two other RCMP officers whom Johnson shot survived.

Carl Weathers was a black character working for the Mounties. Murray Shostak, the Canadian producer, said, "If you notice closely, he is not wearing the Mountie stripe on his pants. He's a sidekick."

In the film Johnson was presented as a World War I veteran, with Captain Tucker providing Johnson's military service record to Millen and the other RCMP officers. According to researcher Frank W. Anderson, virtually nothing is known of Albert Johnson before his arrival at Fort McPherson on July 9, 1931. To this day, the Mad Trapper's true identity has never been established.

Bronson said about the character, "There are many men who have gone to Canada and most of them have gone because they want to be alone.... [many want to] escape from their wives. I'm not saying that's what Albert Johnson did, though... The more I read about Albert Johnson the more I felt he should be made sympathetic."

"We never set out to depict this as an accurate history of Canada," said Shostak. "You try to make it as dramatic and entertaining as possible.... We don't hide it [the fact the film was shot in Canada]. We say that it takes place in Canada and in that sense we've been more nationalistic than a lot of Canadian producers.... In the past five or 10 years, producers have been making a real effort to avoid having their films identified as Canadian because there is a silly theory that Americans won't go see films not shot in America.... We talk about Edmonton and Toronto in the film, and in most respects this is more of a Canadian film than most certified Canadian films."

"The truth is often interred with the bones," said Lee Marvin, quoting William Shakespeare in Hamlet. "But you've got to think of the audience... The closest it gets [to the facts] is the snow. But it's not a documentary. Documentaries show at little theatres and at schools. I loved the movie. I've never seen so many rotten people in one film. There's not a saving grace in anybody."

=== Casting ===
Joan Collins was originally cast in the female lead. She does not appear in the final film. Angie Dickinson accepted what was a relatively small role because she wanted to work with Bronson and Marvin and "I wanted to see Banff". She did admit "my part is so small it looks as if it's been almost cut out of the picture. It hasn't. That's it... I probably wouldn't have done it if the film had been set in Lancaster."

"I think they set out to make a piece of entertainment, not a documentary" said Canadian actor August Schellenberg who appears in the film. "Being Canadian, I've given up on historical fact after seeing Riel. Talk about a travesty - and that was with Canadian taxpayers' money. Death Hunt is American... The experience was fun. I don't think I was treated any differently than Lee Marvin. It's on Canadian films with American stars that you are treated as an also-ran."

On March 1, 2025, a few days after Gene Hackman's death was announced, the Drew Struzan Facebook account revealed that the actor had originally been cast as Millen. Due to creative differences with Hunt, Hackman dropped out of the role shortly before filming. The page showed off artwork that Struzan had drawn with Hackman in the role, which was done before the actor dropped out.

=== Filming ===
Principal photography for Death Hunt took place in March 1980. Location sites included Banff, Canmore and Abraham Lake, Alberta in Canada.

The film featured a Bristol F.2b Fighter replica in RCAF markings. The aircraft was on skis and equipped with an upper wing-mounted machine gun. A second biplane was also used at first before it crashed.

== Release ==
=== Home media ===
Death Hunt was first released on VHS by CBS/Fox video in the early 1980s. A DVD of Death Hunt was released by Anchor Bay Entertainment in January 2005. However, Anchor Bay has since lost distribution rights to the film, and the DVD was forced out of print. Shout! Factory acquired the rights to the film and released it on DVD on February 1, 2011, as a double bill with Butch and Sundance: The Early Days (1979). In 2013, Timeless Media Group (an imprint of Shout! Factory) released a limited run 2k Blu-ray which is also out of print.

== Reception ==
=== Box office ===
The film's box office performance was described as "lethargic".

=== Critical response ===
In Vincent Canby's review for The New York Times, he noted that the plot had problems. "Nothing in Death Hunt makes a great deal of sense, though the scenery is rugged and the snowscapes beautiful." Canby, however, recognized that two old pros were at work. "Mr. Bronson and Mr. Marvin are such old hands at this sort of movie that each can create a character with ease, out of thin, cold air." Reviewer Leonard Maltin characterized Death Hunt as having "... good action, but not enough of it."
