= Slave Craton =

Area of ancient rocks in northwest Canada

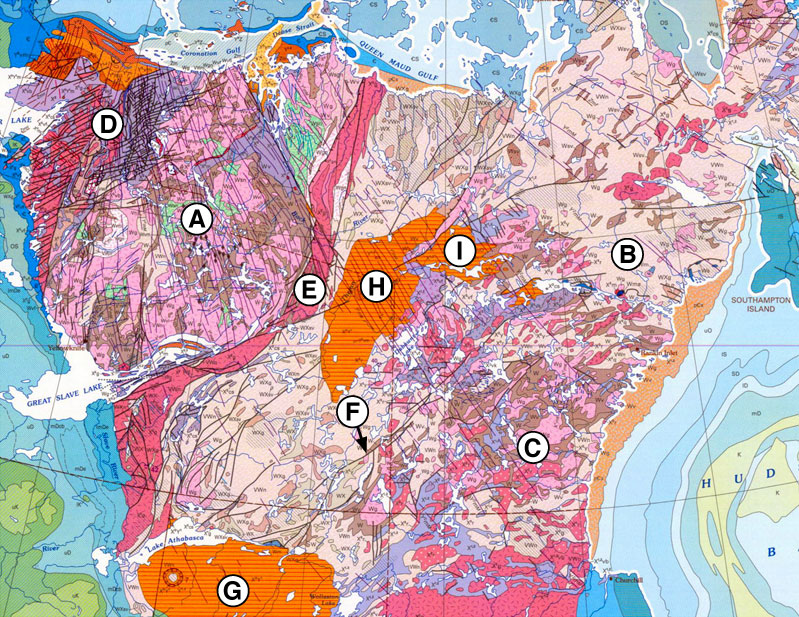
Geological map of north-western Canada. Slave Craton is marked with A.

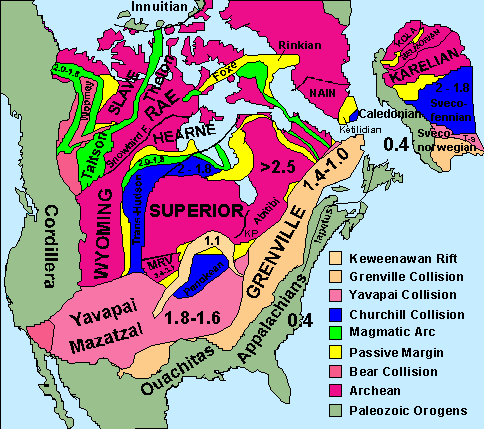
Palaeomap of North American and Scandinavian cratons, basement rocks, and orogenic belts (ages in billions of years)

The Slave craton is an Archaean craton in the north-western Canadian Shield, in Northwest Territories and Nunavut. The Slave Craton includes the 4.03 Ga-old Acasta Gneiss which is one of the oldest dated rocks on Earth. Covering about 300,000 km^{2} (120,000 sq mi), it is a relatively small but well-exposed craton dominated by ~2.73–2.63 Ga (billion years-old) greenstones and turbidite sequences and ~2.72–2.58 Ga plutonic rocks, with large parts of the craton underlain by older gneiss and granitoid units. The Slave Craton is one of the blocks that compose the Precambrian core of North America, also known as the palaeocontinent Laurentia.

The exposed portion of the craton, called the Slave Province, comprises 172,500 km^{2} (66,600 sq mi) and has an elliptical shape that stretches 680 km (420 mi) NNE from Gros Cap on the Great Slave Lake to Cape Barrow on the Coronation Gulf and 460 km (290 mi) EW along latitude 64°N. It covers about 700 km × 500 km (430 mi × 310 mi) and is bounded by Palaeoproterozoic belts to the south, east, and west, while younger rocks cover it to the north.

The Slave Craton is divided into a west-central basement complex, the Central Slave Basement Complex, and an eastern province, named the Hackett River Terrane or the Eastern Slave Province. These two domains are separated by a 2.7 Ga-old suture defined by two isotopic boundaries running north to south over the craton.

== Subdivisions ==
=== Central Slave basement complex ===
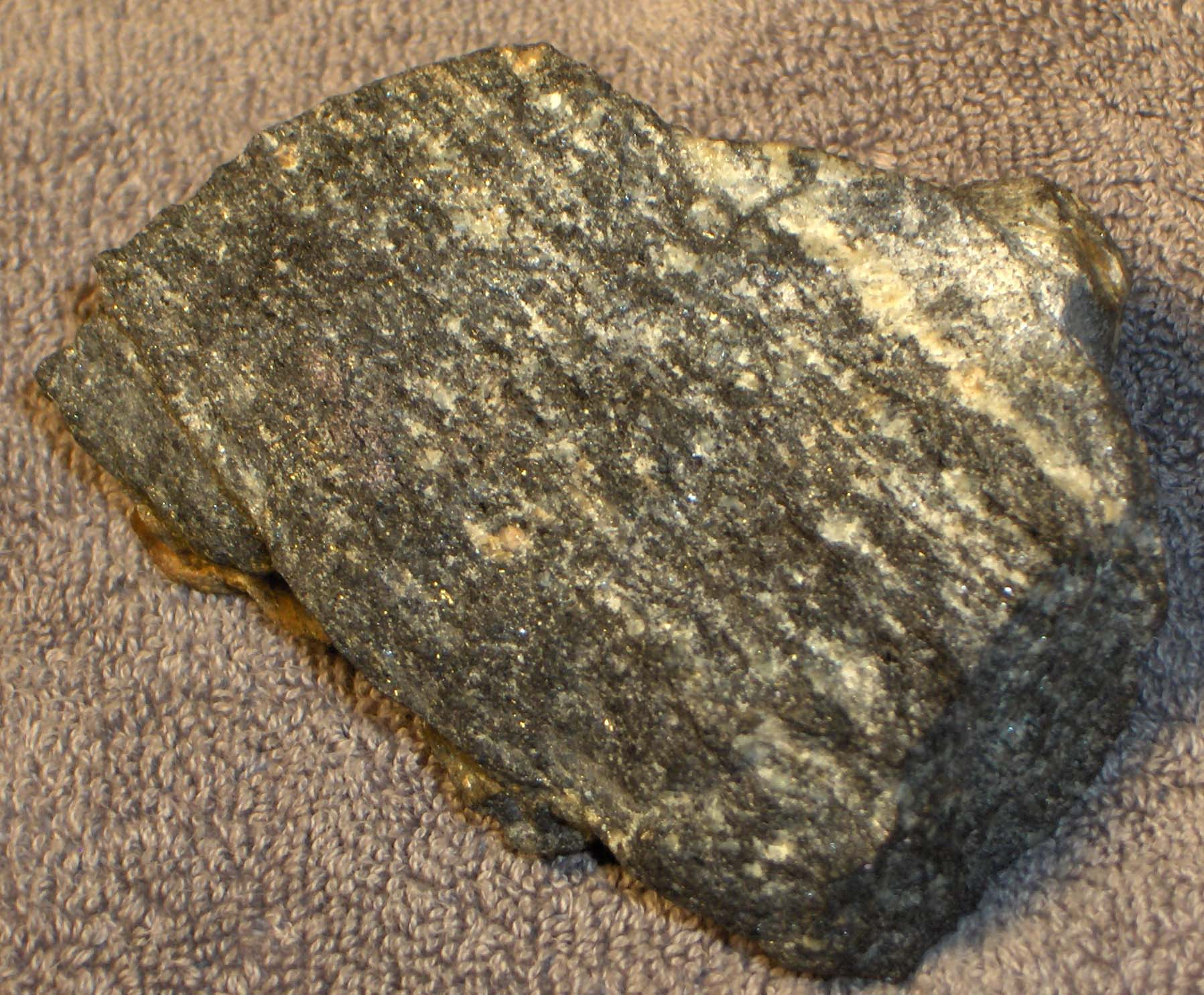
A 4.03 Ga sample from the small Acasta River

The Central Slave basement complex (CSBC) is the basement under the central and western part of the craton. The CSBC's eastern extent is unknown, as its disappearance is marked by Nd and Pb isotopic boundaries. The CSBC dips to the east and underlies at least the central part of the craton. Along the Acasta River the CSBC includes the Acasta Gneisses with a protolith age of about 4.03 Ga, one of the oldest dated rock units on Earth. These gneisses are polymetamorphic and have a tonalitic and gabbroic composition. The rest of the CSBC is younger with a central core <3.5 Ga and the remaining craton with detrial and protolith ages ranging from 3.4 to 2.8 Ga. The basement complex is overlain by Neoarchaean supracrustal sequences and intruded by plutonic suites. The Acasta gneisses are geochemically similar to other Archaean complexes but, four billion years old, they contain even older zircon cores. These cores indicate that the parental magmas of such complexes formed by interaction between the zircon-bearing crust and mantle-derived melts. No such older Acasta gneisses have been discovered yet, but the zircon cores indicate they could exist.

=== Back River volcanic complex ===
The Back River volcanic complex is an Archaean stratovolcano preserved in an upright position surrounded by four sedimentary sequences reflecting the volcano's magmatic history. An exposed dome in the southern half of the complex is interpreted to be the eroded portion of the volcano. In contrast to the remaining craton, the complex has only undergone a low degree of deformation.

=== Yellowknife Supergroup ===
The Yellowknife Supergroup, also known as the Yellowknife greenstone belt, was deposited over 300 million years from ca. 2.9-2.6 Ga, and directly overlies the CSBC including much of the Eastern Slave Province. The CSBC and the Yellowknife greenstone belt are separated by a distinct unconformity that is laterally continuous over hundreds of kilometres. The Yellowknife Supergroup has been exposed to major metamorphism around 2605 Ma resulting in a range of greenschist to lower amphibolite facies. The Supergroup contains at least four distinct sequences representing different tectonic environments, deposited in separate intervals. The four main sequences include from oldest to youngest, the Central Slaver Cover Group, Kam Group, Banting Group, and Jackson Lake Formation. The Yellowknife Supergroup has been used to represent the general stratigraphy of the greenstone belts in the Slave Craton, including belts in the Eastern Slave, in order to interpret the processes involved in the evolution of the Slave Craton.

==== Central Slave Cover Group ====
The Neoarchean supracrustal sequence known as the Central Slave Cover Group (informally Dwyer Group) is a 2.9–2.8 Ga package of fuchsitic quartzites overlain by banded iron formations. This fuchisitic quartziite sequence seems to be characteristic of many other cratons between about 3.1 and 2.8 Ga and marks a global peak in quartzite production. The Central Slave Cover Group is typically 100 to 200 meters thick. A quartz pebble conglomerate found at the base of the Central Slave Cover Group marks a distinct unconformity that is laterally continuous over much of the CSBC. This quartz pebble conglomerate layer has been found as far northwest as the 4.03 Ga Acasta Gneiss Complex. The Central Slave Cover Group is autochthonous and represents a single continuous cover sequence, that links the basement complex in the northwest with the basement in the south-central Slave Province. Uniform, laterally continuous deposition implies that the CSBC was previously a part of a single ancient craton that existed as early as 2.85 Ga.

==== Kam Group ====
The Kam Group is a 0.3–6 kilometre thick sequence that overlies banded iron formations of the Central Slave Cover Group. The contact between these two groups is not well preserved due to the intrusion of gabbro sills and moderate shearing. The Kam group is separated into a lower and upper group based on the existence of a thin felsic volcaniclastic layer (Ranney Chert) dated at 2722 Ma. The lower Kam group consists of the Chan Formation which contains flows of pillowed basalts intruded by a series of gabbroic sills and dikes that were produced in an extensional back-arc basin setting. Sedimentary rocks exposed in the northern part of the formation are between 2.84 and 2.80 Ga. The Upper Kam Group contains three formations deposited between 2772 and 2701 Ma. It is composed mainly of intermediate and basaltic volcanic rocks with thin intercalated rhyolite tuff layers and minor komatiite flows. Rocks in this formation were seemingly formed in an arc environment and may be a result of rifting of basement rocks due to increased mantle plume activity.

==== Banting Group ====
The Banting group is a north-striking sequence that is faulted overtop of the older Kam Group and younger Jackson Lake Formation. The contact between the lower units and the Banting Group is a disconformity that represents a ~40 million year gap in deposition. The Banting Group contains siliceous to intermediate volcanic rocks that are typically calk-alkalic. The Banting Group formation is largely a result of post 2.7 Ga volcanism and sub-volcanic activity. A series of 2658 Ma quartz-feldspar intrusions are found throughout the underlying Kam group that are related to the post 2.7 Ga volcanism found in the Banting Group.

==== Jackson Lake Formation ====
Deposition of the Jackson Lake Formation began at 2605 Ma. The formation is a high energy sedimentary deposit that overlies the volcanic rocks of the Kam Group. The deposit consists of polymict conglomerates and fluvial sandstones that have been subjected to a major metamorphic event as evident by similarly oriented vertical dips and lineations found in older groups.

== Evolution of Slave Craton ==
=== Earliest formation ===
Information on the earliest formation of the Slave Craton may be found in the Acasta Gneiss Complex, but due to the complex history, poor preservation, and lack of exposure, much is still unknown about crustal forming processes in the Hadean and early Archean. Xenocrysts found within 3.94 Ga tonalitic gneisses of the Acasta Gneiss Complex have U–Pb dates of 4.2 Ga. These zircon xenocrysts originally crystallized in a granitic magma of crustal origin. Further evidence suggests that the 3.94 Ga tonalitic gneisses are at least partly derived from this 4.2 Ga granite magma, which indicates that crustal reworking was an important process in the Eoarchean. Zircons from this granite protolith shows similarities to zircons from the Yilgarn craton in Western Australia, and may be evidence for continental crust forming in the Hadean Eon. However, it is suggested that these two cratons have never been directly connected, which may indicate that the early Hadean crust was primarily continental granite. Trace isotope analysis show that these early granite rocks originated from a highly depleted mantle and suggest that large scale differentiation occurred before ~4.0 Ga. These zircon crystals may be important in furthering the understanding of the earliest crustal formation processes, as little is yet known.

=== Craton stabilization ===
The overall stability of a craton is highly correlated to the presence of a strong and deep continental lithospheric mantle because it protects the crust from thermal erosion and mitigates the effects of tectonism. The Slave Craton shows a long history of continental lithospheric mantle formation. Diamond formation is relatively extensive throughout the Slave Craton and requires a thick cratonic root. The oldest diamonds derived from the mantle were between 3.5 and 3.3 Ga, which suggest that the Slave Protocraton would have formed a thick crustal root by this time. The main stabilization of the Slave craton occurred in the Neoarchean at ~2.75 Ga as noted by an abundance of peridotite formation The Kaapval Craton showed a similar peak age of growth which may suggest that much of the earth's continental lithospheric mantle was formed in the Neoarchean The formation and stabilization of the continental lithospheric mantle and the evolution of the crust are closely related during the period between 2.8 and 2.0 Ga.

=== Tectonic history ===
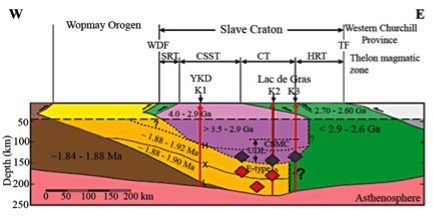
Cross-section of the Slave Province including Slave Craton. SRT: Snare River Terrane, CSST: Central Slave Superterrane, CT: Contwoyto Terrane, HRT: Hackett River Terrane.

Attempts to reconstruct the craton's tectonic history have focused extensively on the east–west asymmetry. The presence of a collisional suture suggests the CSBC collided with an island arc terrane along a boundary directed north–south before 2.69 Ga. Alternatively, the Eastern Slave may be an attenuated and modified Mesoarchaean lithosphere which developed during rifting at 2.85–2.70 Ga. The mantle lithosphere under the western Slave can be 400 Ma older than that underlying the eastern Slave. Furthermore, rifting is backed up by the existence of younger arc or back-arc rocks that overly the CSBC, but make up most of the Eastern Slave. However, whether the Eastern Slave was the result of rifting or the accretion of another terrane is still up for debate.

Following the 2.7 Ga rifting or accretion event, the Slave underwent large scale extension at 2680 Ma resulting in the formation of the > 400x800 km Burwash Basin, widespread mafic sills, and other younger turbidites along the northwestern margin. The Burwash Basin consists of metamorphosed turbiditic sandstones and slates interspersed with thin felsic tuff layers. At 2634 Ma the Slave switched to a compressional regime and the Burwash Basin started to close, possibly due to shallow subduction from the NW or SE. By 2.6 Ga the Slave had collided with the much larger Sclavia, resulting in shortening and cross-folding over the craton. The presence of three rifted margins around the Slave, as well as similarly aged 3.3–3.5 Ga basement rocks, fuchsitic quartzite, and 2.9 Ga tonalites, suggest that the Dharwar, Zimbabwe, and Wyoming cratons were also part of Sclavia. The Slave broke off of Sclavia between 2.2 and 2.0 Ga, as noted by a host of dyke swarms at its margins. The Slave Craton drifted for approximately 200 million years before its accretion with the Rae Craton around 2.0–1.8 Ga in the Taltson–Thelon orogeny. The orogenic belt accreted smaller exotic terranes before the Slave was eventually subducted eastward under the Rae, resulting in a continental magmatic arc known as the Taltson magmatic zone. Continual eastward movement of the Slave province, along with collision of the Hottah terrane on the western margin of the Slave, lead to intense deformation of the Taltson magmatic zone. The Hottah terrane accreted with the Slave during the Wopmay orogeny at 1.88 Ga, shortly after the Thelon orogeny. This event produced another continental magmatic arc on the Slave's western margin, the Great Bear magmatic zone, as well as the Wopmay fault zone. The Wopmay fault zone consists of thin skinned thrust belts that mark the suture between the Hottah terrane and Slave Craton. These two orogenies have emplaced the Slave Craton within Laurentia, where it is still found today.

== See also ==
- Geology of Canada
- Canadian Shield
- Flin Flon greenstone belt
- Hearne Craton
- Wyoming Craton
