= Wop May =

Canadian flying ace (Wilfrid Reid May; 1896–1952)

Wilfrid Reid May OBE DFC
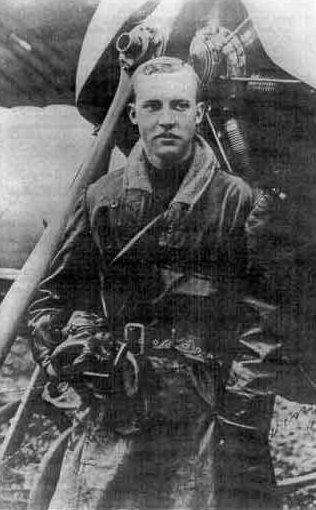
- Wop May, c. 1920
- Born: March 20, 1896; Carberry, Manitoba, Canada
- Died: June 21, 1952 (aged 56); American Fork, Utah, United States
- Burial place: Edmonton, Alberta, Canada
- Military career
- Allegiance: Canada; United Kingdom
- Branch: Canadian Expeditionary Force; British Army; Royal Air Force
- Service years: 1916–1918
- Rank: Captain
- Unit: No. 209 Squadron RAF
- Conflicts: First World War
- Awards: Officer of the Order of the British Empire; Distinguished Flying Cross; Medal of Freedom (United States)

Wilfrid Reid "Wop" May, OBE, DFC (March 20, 1896 – June 21, 1952) was a Canadian flying ace in the First World War and a leading post-war aviator. He was the final Allied pilot to be pursued by Manfred von Richthofen before the German ace was shot down on the Western Front in 1918. After the war, May returned to Canada, pioneering the role of a bush pilot while working for Canadian Airways in Northern Alberta and the Northwest Territories.

== Early life ==
May was born in Carberry, Manitoba, the son of a carriage maker, Alexander Esson May, and his wife, Elizabeth May (née Reid). He was the third of four children.

His family moved to Edmonton in 1902. On the way, they stayed with family and friends; his two-year-old cousin, Mary Lumsden, could not pronounce Wilfrid and called him "Woppie". This gave him his nickname "Wop". He attended the Edmonton High School (now Victoria School of Performing and Visual Arts) while in Edmonton.

== First World War ==
May joined the Canadian Expeditionary Force (CEF) in February 1916 during the First World War. He rose through the enlisted ranks to sergeant and spent most of 1916 as a gunnery instructor in Canada. In 1917, his battalion, the 202nd (Sportsman's) Battalion, was shipped to England, where he and his friend Ray Ross applied to join the Royal Flying Corps. His first flight resulted in the accidental destruction of his own and another aircraft; nevertheless, the RFC accepted his application, and May resigned from the CEF. After initial training in London in October, he was moved to a fighter training squadron and graduated in February 1918.

On April 9, 1918, Lieutenant May was transferred to No. 209 Squadron of the newly created Royal Air Force (the squadron being a unit of the Royal Naval Air Service until April 1, when the RAF was created). The squadron was commanded by another Canadian, May's former school friend Roy Brown, who had never lost a subordinate pilot. May spent a few days getting used to his Sopwith Camel and was sent to France.

May fought his first aerial combat on April 20, 1918. The German Fokker Triplane he was duelling crashed of its own accord during the brief fight.

=== Death of the Red Baron ===
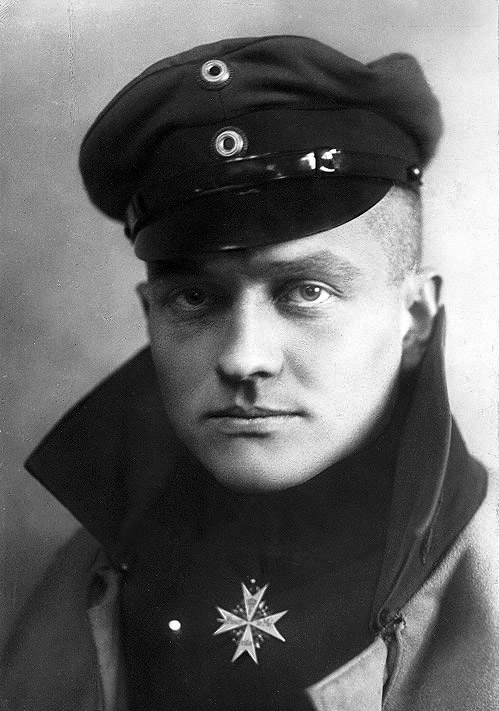
Manfred von Richthofen

The following day, April 21, saw 209 Squadron again on patrol. Due to his inexperience, Brown gave May similar instructions as before – he was to stay out of the fights and simply keep an eye out. Around 10 a.m., the squadron attacked a group of German Triplanes. At first, during the dogfight, May circled above. But when he spotted a German plane doing the same thing, he decided to launch an attack.

May chased a German aircraft that fled into the middle of the dogfight, and fired on him. The German he was chasing was Wolfram von Richthofen, cousin of Manfred von Richthofen, the "Red Baron". Wolfram had also been given orders to sit out above the fight and watch because he was a novice flyer too.

On seeing his cousin being attacked, Manfred, in a red Fokker Dr.I, flew to his rescue and fired on May, causing him to pull away and saving Wolfram's life. Richthofen pursued May across the Somme.

May spoke about this incident years later, saying, "the first thing I knew I was being fired on from the rear ... [and] all I could do was try to dodge my attacker. I noticed it was a red tri-plane, but if I realized it was Richthofen, I would have probably passed out on the spot. I kept on dodging and spinning, I imagine from about 12,000 feet until I ran out of sky and had to hedge hop over the ground. Richthofen was firing at me continually, [and] the only thing that saved me was my poor flying. I didn't know what I was doing myself and I do not suppose that Richthofen could figure out what I was going to do".

Roy Brown, who was flying above, noticed the Red Baron chasing May, dove steeply at very high speed to intervene and then had to climb steeply to avoid hitting the ground. Richthofen turned to avoid this attack, and then resumed his pursuit of May. Richthofen was shot and killed at some point during this encounter, however, the identity of the person who shot down the Red Baron remains a subject of much dispute.

May continued flying with 209 Squadron until the end of the war and was credited with downing 15 enemy aircraft and probably five others. He was awarded the Distinguished Flying Cross in 1918. He relinquished his RAF commission on May 8, 1919, with the rank of captain.

== Postwar career ==
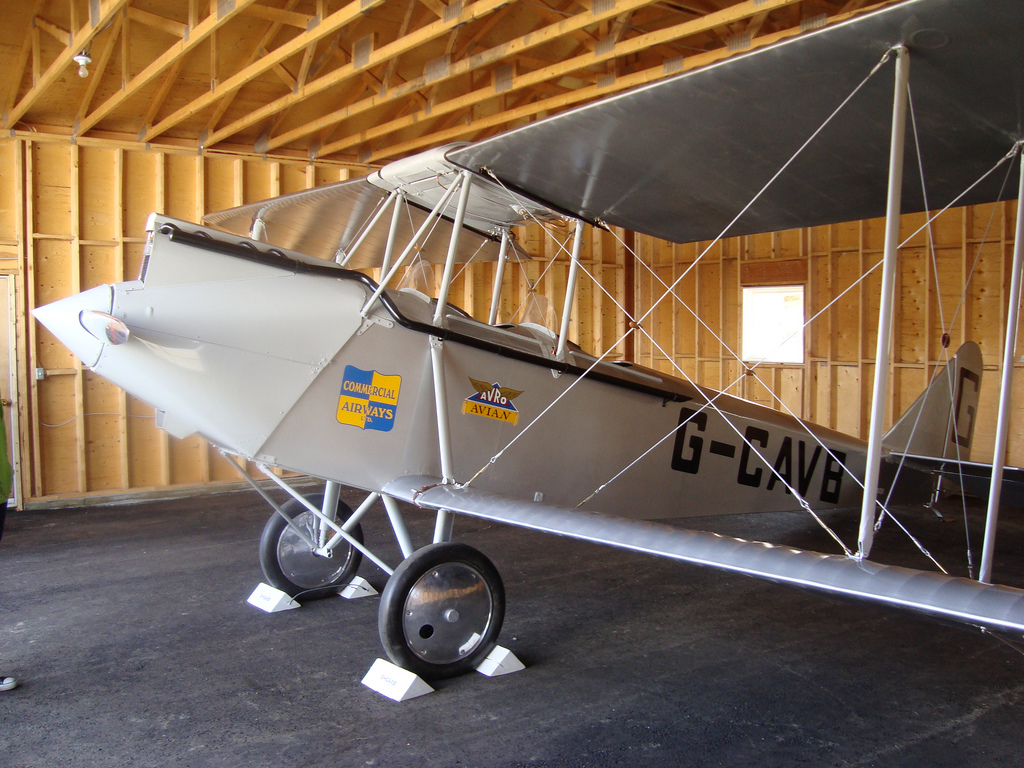
Replica of Wop May Avro Avian G-CAVB airplane, on display at Fort Edmonton Park

May returned to Edmonton after the war. He and his brother Elgin rented a Curtiss JN-4 "Canuck" and started May Airplanes Ltd., opening Canada's first "air harbour" (or aeroport) in a rented pasture, known as May Field, and is near the Mayfield neighborhood. The aircraft is hanging in the lobby of the new Royal Alberta Museum which opened on October 3, 2018. They appeared at various functions during 1919, and are now considered one of the first barnstorming companies in the world.

In September 1919, May Aeroplanes was hired by Edmonton Police Chief Hill during their manhunt for John Larson, wanted on two counts of murder (including of a police officer) and a break-in. May flew Edmonton Police Detective James Campbell to the small town of Edson, and Larson was caught soon thereafter. This was the first time an aircraft was used in a manhunt.

They were soon joined by George Gorman to become May-Gorman Airplanes Ltd. – George Gorman delivered the Edmonton Journal newspaper to Wetaskiwin, 45 miles (72 km) south of Edmonton.

May and Gorman were hired by Imperial Oil Limited to fly two Junkers airplanes, equipped with skis, from New York to Edmonton in early 1921. Imperial Oil planned to use these planes in the Northwest Territories to service its proposed oil developments along the Mackenzie River at what would later become known as Norman Wells. In March, Gorman and Elmer Fullerton flew these two planes across the 60th parallel (the first ever flight into the Northwest Territories) into the Canadian subarctic, proving that aircraft could operate in sub-zero temperatures. This was the start of aerial exploration in the most distant parts of Canada. In 1924, the business failed.

In 1924, May married Violet "Vi" Bode in November. He decided to get a ground-based job, joining National Cash Register in Dayton, Ohio where he went for training. While working on a lathe, he was hit in one eye by a shard of steel, and from then until 1939, he began slowly going blind in that eye.

Convinced that flying really was his calling, he returned to Edmonton and formed the Edmonton and North Alberta Flying Club in 1927 and became a flight instructor.

=== Race against death ===
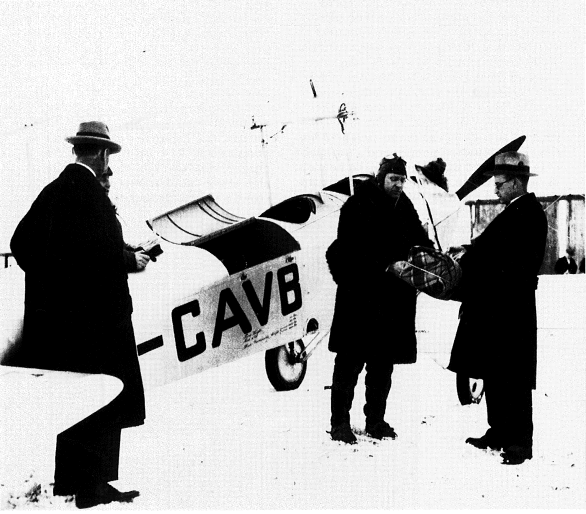
Dr. Malcolm Ross Bow hands serum wrapped in a blanket to Wop May for his 1929 mercy flight.

In December 1928, Bert Logan, an employee of the Hudson's Bay Company was posted to Little Red River, Alberta, on arrival he was unpacking when he suddenly became very ill. His wife, a nurse, realized he had diphtheria, and a desperate effort started to get inoculations to the town before anyone else was seriously infected. Simply getting the word out that help was needed was an adventure in its own. At the time, there were no roads in the north, and the nearest telegraph station was miles away over a frozen landscape.

The message eventually reached Edmonton, and on January 1, May was asked if he could deliver the medicine. He left in an Avro Avian with another flying club member, Vic Horner, the next day around noon, and landed on Kimiwan Lake, McLennan for the night just before 4 p.m. when it was becoming dark. They refueled on the Peace River and continued their flight, arriving in Fort Vermilion at 3 p.m. A group had just arrived from Little Red River and the drugs were quickly distributed. They had to stop in Peace River on the return flight due to engine damage from the low quality fuel, and did not arrive back in Edmonton until January 7. By this point, his flight had become known across Canada as "the race against death", and he and Horner arrived to find a media circus and a mob of thousands of Edmontonians waiting for them at the airport.

The news of this remarkable flight helped May establish a new company, Commercial Airways, to provide air service to northern Canada. The company won a government contract for air mail to the Northwest Territories, a service that had been pioneered by Punch Dickins' rival Western Canada Airways. Both companies would eventually become part of Canadian Pacific Air Lines.

=== Hunt for the Mad Trapper ===
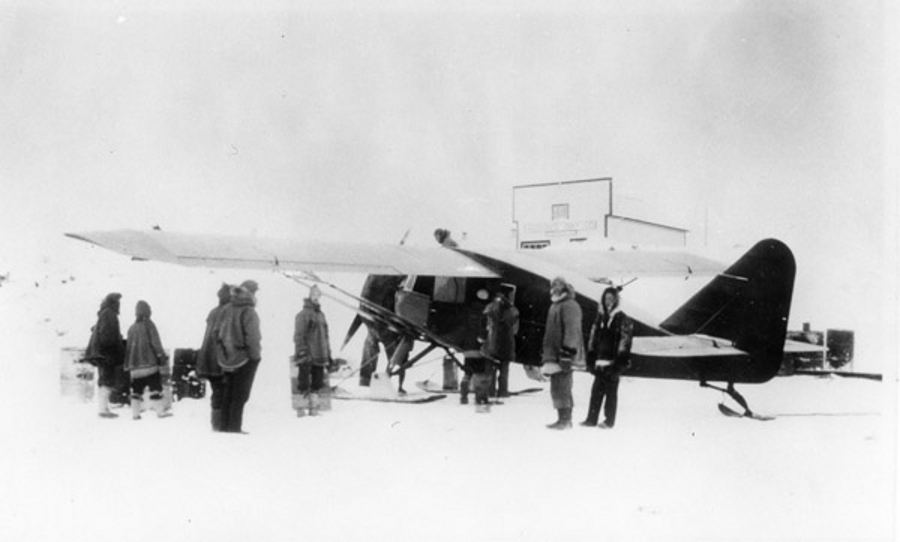
Wop May loads his Bellanca Pacemaker aircraft at Aklavik.

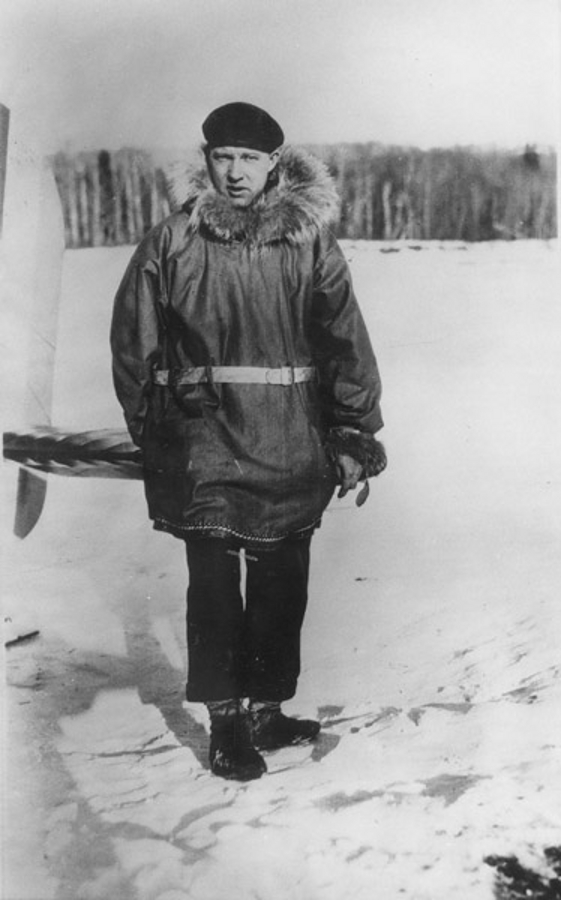
Wop May was hired by the Royal Canadian Mounted Police to hunt Albert Johnson from the air.

In early 1932, May was involved in another manhunt, this time for Albert Johnson, soon known as the "Mad Trapper of Rat River." While serving a search warrant for illegal trapping on the Rat River, Constable King of the RCMP was shot and wounded by Johnson, sparking off a long chase that became front-page news across the continent. Johnson killed Constable Edger Millen.

May was again hired to see if he could find Johnson, who had seemingly disappeared. On February 13, May solved the mystery when he noted a set of footprints leading off from caribou tracks in the middle of the frozen river. Johnson had been following their tracks to hide his own, but had to strike off the path to set up camp at night. Following the trail over the next few days, the RCMP rounded a bend on the river on February 17 to find Johnson in the middle of the trail again, unable to dodge for the bank without his snowshoes on. A firefight broke out during which one of the RCMP officers was seriously wounded and Johnson killed. May arrived just after the action ended. He landed beside the injured officer, flew him 125 miles (201 km) to a doctor and was credited with saving his life.

These actions were later heavily fictionalized in the 1981 Charles Bronson film Death Hunt. The film depicts May as the fictional RCAF "Captain Tucker," who in the film fired wildly at everyone on the ground, including the posse, who fired back and caused him to crash into a mountain.

== Second World War ==
With the start of the Second World War, it was decided that Canada would become the major trainer for RAF pilots from the British Commonwealth. The British Commonwealth Air Training Plan set up airfields across Canada, and May became the commander of the No.2 Air Observer School in Edmonton, as well as supervisor of all the western schools.

While this was going on, the United States was also ferrying huge numbers of aircraft to the Soviet Union, flying through Edmonton on their way. A number of these crashed due to mechanical problems, in which case there was no way for an injured pilot to get out of the "back country". It was decided to form a team of parachute jumpers that could be dropped in on the crash sites to stabilize the injured pilots and start moving them out of the bush. May was involved in this effort.

Early efforts were comical but dangerous, but the US trained a number of jumpers at a smokejumper school in Montana, and it was not long before the Para-Rescue team was in service. Several additional Para-Rescue teams were set up during the war, and by the time the war ended, the value of these teams had been recognized. They were soon re-organized into their own command within the Canadian military, Search and Rescue. For his work in search and rescue, May was awarded the Medal of Freedom, with Bronze Palm in 1947 by the United States Army Air Forces.

== Death ==
May was on vacation with his son Denny on June 21, 1952. He died from a stroke while hiking to Timpanogos Cave, near American Fork, Utah. He is buried in the Edmonton, Alberta Municipal Cemetery.

== Legacy ==
In addition to the Distinguished Flying Cross and the United States Medal of Freedom, Wop May was awarded the Trans-Canada (McKee) Trophy in 1929 and appointed Officer of the Order of the British Empire in 1935. In 1974, May was declared a National Historic Person, and a plaque to commemorate him was installed in Edmonton in 1978.

May is immortalized in songs by Stompin' Tom Connors ("Wop May"), The Gumboots ("Wop May"), and John Spearn ("Roy Brown and Wop May"). He was also the subject of a 1979 National Film Board of Canada vignette.

On October 6, 2004, NASA's Mars Exploration Rover Opportunity located a rock on the south slope of the Endurance Crater on Mars. The 1 metre (3.3-foot) rock was given the name "wopmay" after the legendary Canadian bush pilot.

Canada has a geologic feature known as the Wopmay Fault Zone, lying to the west of Hudson Bay along the Wopmay River, where the earliest mountains in the world appeared during the Paleoproterozoic era, approximately two billion years ago.

The city of Edmonton, Alberta, named the neighbourhood of Mayfield in honour of Wop May.

In 2017 the airport at Fort Vermilion, Alberta, was renamed Fort Vermilion (Wop May Memorial) Aerodrome in his honour.
