= Albert Johnson (criminal) =

Canadian fugitive and criminal

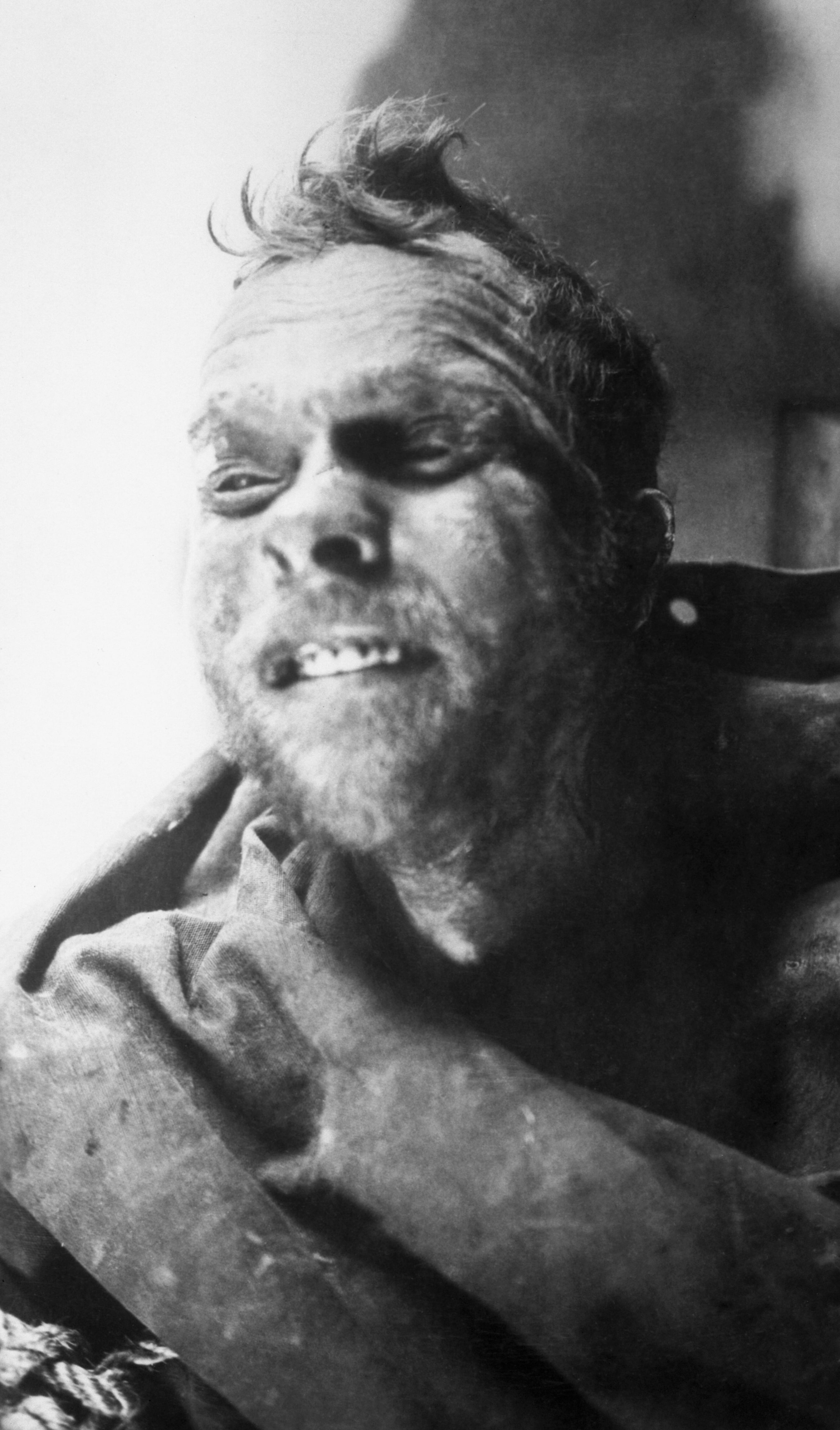
- Corpse of Albert Johnson, c. 1932
- Born: c. 1890–1900 unknown
- Died: 17 February 1932; Eagle River, Yukon, Canada
- Cause of death: Gunshot wounds
- Resting place: Aklavik, Northwest Territories, Canada
- Other names: "The Mad Trapper of Rat River", "The Demented Trapper"
- Time at large: 16 January – 17 February 1932

Details
- Killed: 1 (RCMP Constable Millen)
- Weapon: .22 LR Winchester Model 58 Rifle.30-30 Savage Model 99F Sawed-off 16-gauge Iver Johnson Champion shotgun

Albert Johnson (c. 1890–1900 – 17 February 1932), also known as the Mad Trapper of Rat River, was a fugitive, whose actions stemming from a trapping dispute eventually sparked a huge manhunt in the Northwest Territories and Yukon in Northern Canada. The event became a media circus as Johnson eluded the Royal Canadian Mounted Police (RCMP) team sent to take him into custody, which ended after a 240 km (150 mi) pursuit lasting more than a month and a shootout in which Johnson was fatally wounded on the Eagle River, Yukon. Albert Johnson is suspected to have been a pseudonym and his true identity remains unknown.

== Attack on police ==
Albert Johnson arrived in Fort McPherson after coming down the Peel River on 9 July 1931. He was questioned by RCMP constable Edgar Millen, but provided little information. Millen thought he had a Scandinavian accent, generally kept himself clean-shaven, and seemed to have plenty of money for supplies. He was suspected to be in his 30s. After venturing the waterways in an indigenous-built raft to the Mackenzie River delta, he built a small 2.5 m × 3 m (8 ft × 10 ft) cabin on the banks of the Rat River. Johnson had not acquired a trapping licence, which was considered odd for someone living in the bush. At that time many northern native traditional trapping areas were being invaded by outsiders fleeing the Great Depression and some complaints may have been intended to remove him.

In the end of December, indigenous trappers complained to the local RCMP detachment in Aklavik that 'Johnson' was tampering with their traps, tripping them and hanging them on the trees. A post incident investigation by the RCMP "found an entirely different story. Evidently, Johnson had roughly told them to take off and had even pointed a gun at them, when they came-a-visiting at Johnson's cabin".

On 26 December, Constable Alfred King and Special Constable Joe Bernard, each of whom had a considerable northern experience, trekked the 100 km (60 mi) to Johnson's cabin to ask him about the allegations. Seeing smoke coming from the chimney, they approached the hut to talk. Johnson refused to talk to them, however, seeming not even to notice them. King looked into the cabin window, at which point Johnson placed a sack across it. The two constables eventually decided to return to Aklavik and get a search warrant.

King and Bernard returned five days later with two other men. Johnson again refused to talk and eventually King decided to enforce the warrant and force the door. As soon as he began, Johnson shot him through the wooden door. A brief firefight broke out, and the team managed to return the wounded King to Aklavik where he eventually recovered.

== Manhunt ==
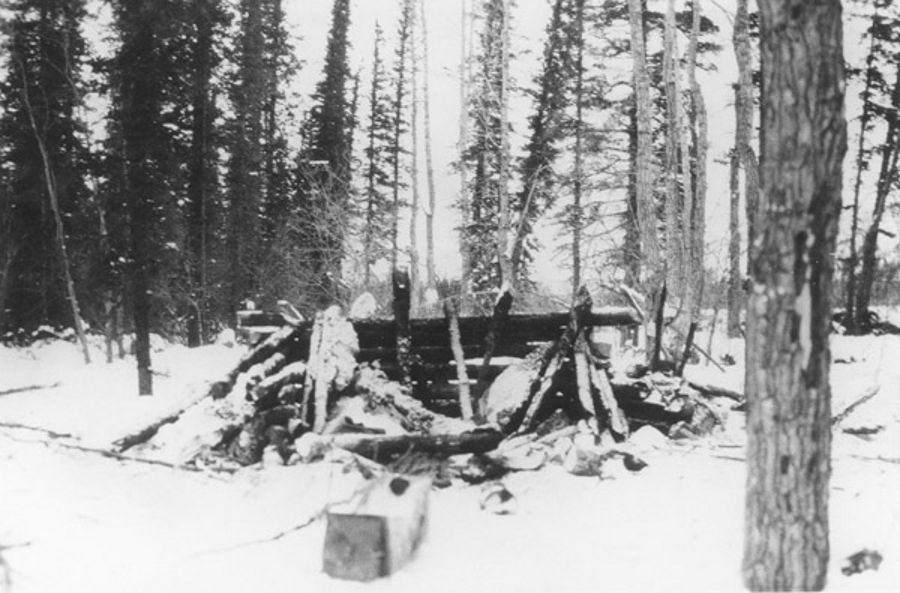
Albert Johnson kept fighting from a hole in the ruins of his cabin on Rat River after RCMP besieged and destroyed it with dynamite.

A larger group of RCMP officers, special constables and local volunteers returned to Johnson's cabin on 9 January 1932. During a 15-hour siege, hundreds of shots were fired into the cabin and dynamite was used to blow off part of the roof, but Johnson remained inside. After surrounding the cabin they thawed the dynamite inside their coats. The common version states that this charge was thrown onto the roof of the cabin, collapsing it in the following explosion. After the explosion, the men tried to rush in. Johnson opened fire from a 1.5 m (5 ft) deep dugout beneath the ruins. No one was hit, and after a 15-hour standoff (ending at 4:00 am) in the −40 °C (−40 °F) weather, the posse retreated to Aklavik for further assistance. Again, the RCMP investigative report partially contradicts this, claiming that the dynamite charge barely damaged the cabin, but it was later purposely destroyed to prevent him from returning to it, which may have led to the impression that the blast had destroyed it.

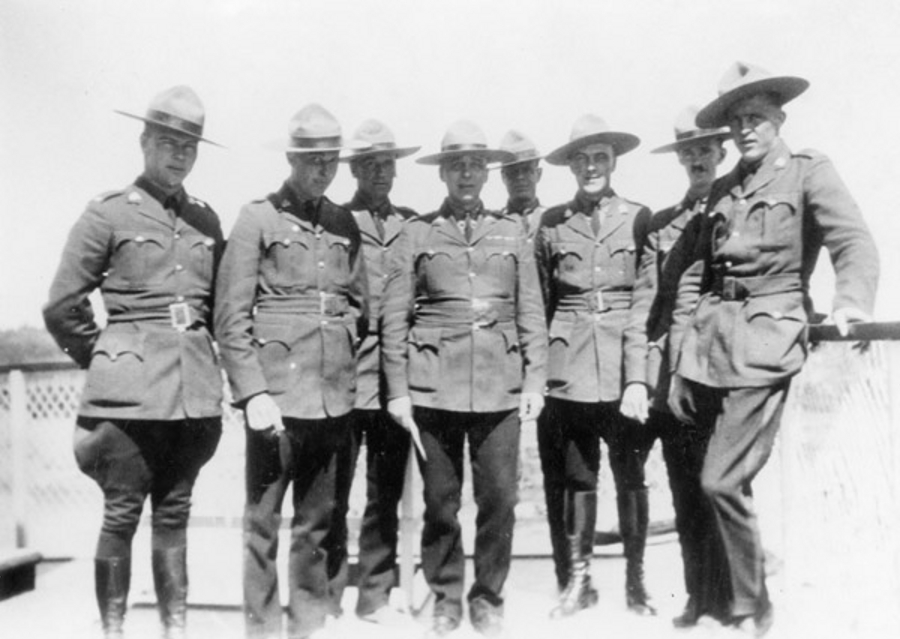
A few of the RCMP involved in hunting the "Mad Trapper". Left to right: Constable A. W. King (wounded); Mr. Hutchinson; Corporal Hall; unknown; Mr. Melville; Corporal R. S. Wild; Constable E. "Newt" Millen (killed); unknown.

Word of the confrontation was relayed south through the Royal Canadian Corps of Signals station at Aklavik, and the story became front-page news. After being delayed because of blizzard conditions, the reinforced posse returned on 14 January to find that Johnson had left the cabin, and the posse struck out after him. Eventually, they caught up with him on 30 January, surrounding him in a thicket. In the ensuing firefight, Johnson shot Constable Edgar Millen through the heart, killing him. (Note: Millen was later to have a tributary of the Rat River, Millen Creek, named for him. A memorial is located in the area.) Once again the pursuers retreated. The posse continued to grow, enlisting local Inuvialuit and Gwichʼin who were better able to move in the back country. Johnson had apparently decided to leave for the Yukon, but the RCMP blocked the only two passes over the Richardson Mountains. That did not stop Johnson, who climbed a 2,100 m (7,000 ft) peak and once again disappeared.

After Millen's death, the RCMP requested an aircraft for the search. Canadian Airways pilot Wilfrid "Wop" May, a First World War flying ace and postwar aviator, flew north with mechanic Jack Bowen to assist. They arrived at Aklavik in a ski-equipped Bellanca monoplane on 5 February. May spotted Johnson's tracks beyond the Richardson Mountains, showing that Johnson had crossed the range despite the RCMP blocking the main passes. On 14 February, May found tracks on the Bell River and followed them to where they turned south up the Eagle River. He noticed a set of footprints leading from the centre of the frozen river to the bank. Johnson had been following caribou tracks in the middle of the river, where the animals walked for visibility against predators. Walking in their tracks concealed his footprints and allowed him to travel on compacted snow without using his snowshoes. He left the trail at night to make camp on the river bank, leaving the tracks May had spotted. May radioed his findings to the RCMP, and the pursuit followed Johnson up the river. Officers reached him on 17 February.

== Death ==
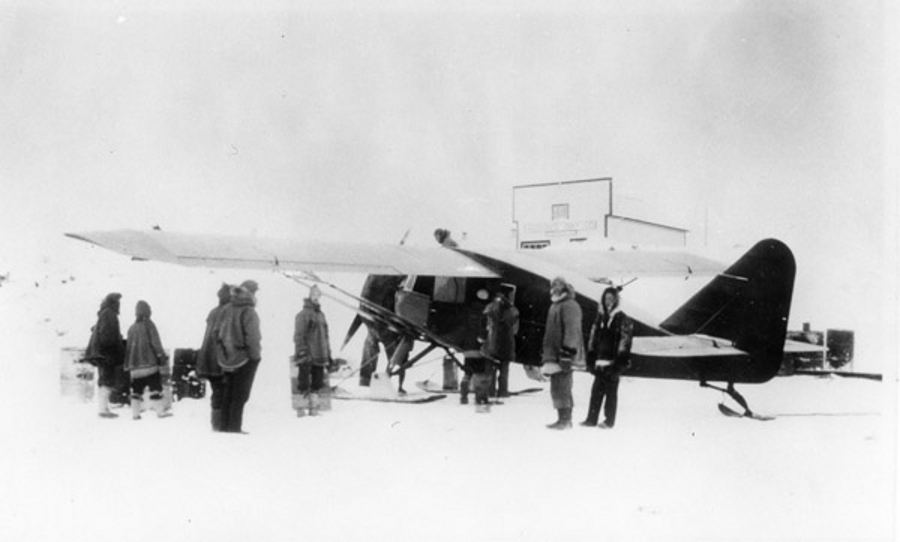
Wop May loads his airplane at Aklavik

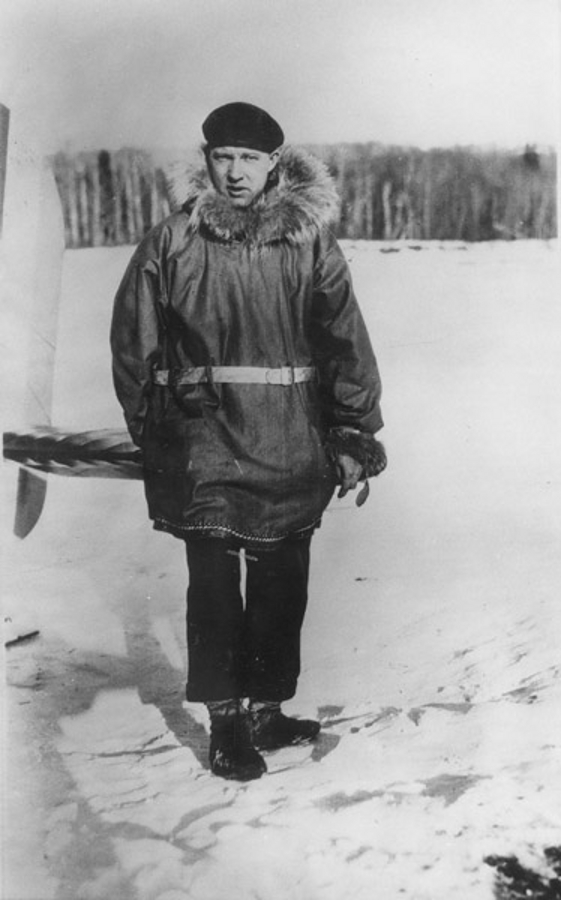
Wop May was hired by the RCMP to hunt Albert Johnson from the air

The pursuit team rounded a bend in the river to find Johnson only a few hundred metres (a few hundred yards), standing in front of them. Johnson attempted to run for the bank but was not wearing his snowshoes and could not make it. A firefight broke out in which RCMP Constable Alfred King was seriously wounded and Johnson was killed after being shot in the left side of the pelvis at an acute angle. It is believed that the bullet passed through vital tissues, bowels, and main arteries, which led to his death. May landed the plane, picked up the injured King and flew him to help, for which May was credited with saving King's life.

After Johnson's death, RCMP officials realized that he had travelled over 137 km (85 mi) away from his cabin in 33 days, burning approximately 42 MJ (10,000 kcal) a day in the cold weather and hostile terrain. Seventy-five years later in 2007, forensics teams found that his tailbone was not actually symmetrical, causing his spine to curve left and right slightly. In addition, one foot was longer than the other.

An examination of Johnson's body yielded over $2,000 in both U.S. and Canadian dollars, as well as some gold, a pocket compass, a razor, a knife, fish hooks, nails, a dead squirrel, a dead bird, a large quantity of Beecham's Pills (one of the very few patent medicines with actual benefits, namely a digestive aid), and teeth with gold fillings that were believed to be his. His dental work was of exceptional quality, suggesting poverty was not a reason for him to relocate North. Johnson had led a successful solitary life, if not a middle-class background, making his actions even more mysterious. During the entire chase, the Mounties had never heard Johnson utter a single word. At the time, the only person known to have heard his spoken voice was the RCMP constable who had interviewed him over his business in the town. The constable believed Johnson to be of Scandinavian origin, which modern DNA tests seem to confirm. All that the posse had heard from Johnson was his laugh after he shot Constable Edgar Millen. To this day people debate who he was, why he moved to the Arctic, and if he was actually responsible for interfering with the trap lines as alleged.

== Identity ==
The RCMP sent a series of photographs throughout Canada and the United States in an unsuccessful effort to learn his real identity, which has never been definitively established.

Portraits of 'Albert Johnson'

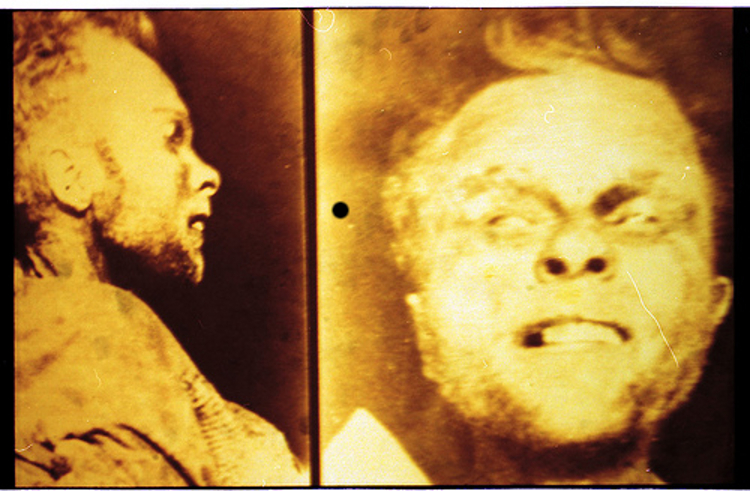
RCMP photographs of the deceased.

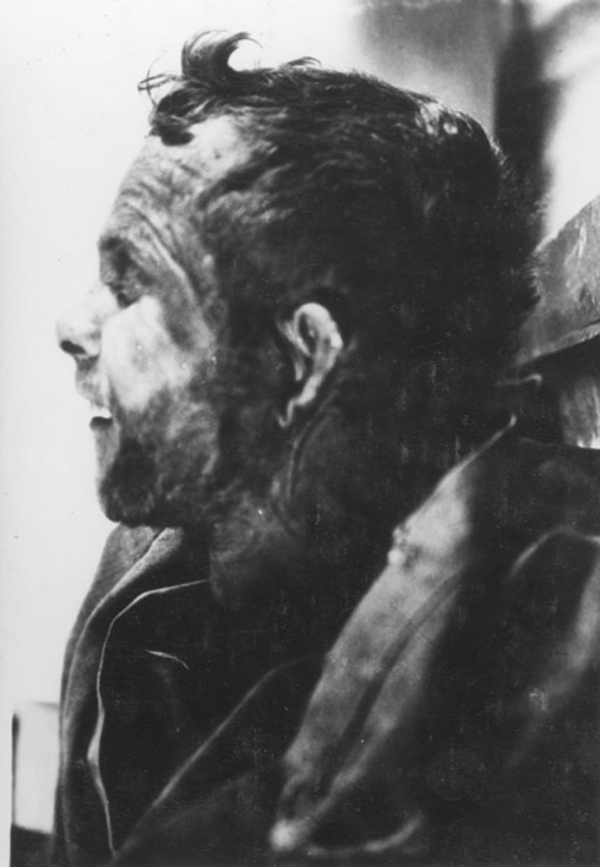
Left side profile of Johnson's corpse.

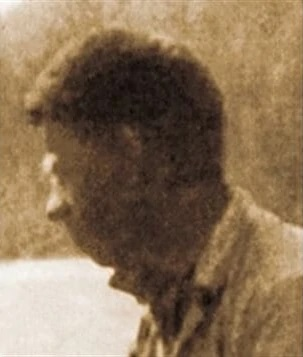
Possible photograph of Johnson during life.

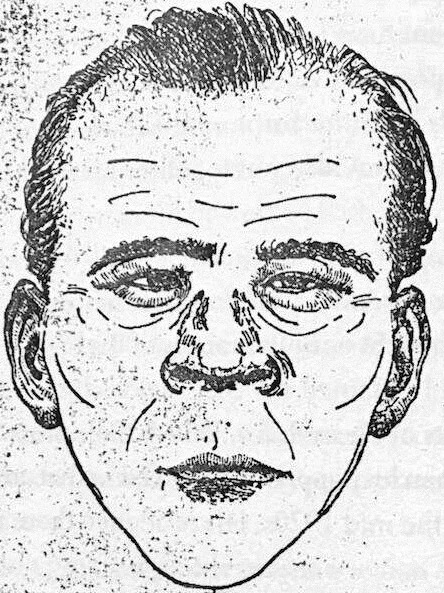
Early forensic facial reconstruction created in efforts to identify the man.

=== Proposed identities ===
Arthur Nelson

In the 1930s, the initial investigation about the identity of Albert Johnson primarily focused on an obscure individual named Arthur Nelson. Details of Nelson's life were recorded by Yukon researcher and author Richard North. Nelson apparently travelled from Dease Lake, British Columbia, up into the Yukon in the 1927 to 1931 period. He had similar guns (a Savage Model 99, a .30-30 Winchester calibre lever action rifle, a sawn-off Iver-Johnson 16 gauge shotgun and a sawn-off Winchester Model 58 .22 Long Rifle) as Albert Johnson. Nelson was also remembered by Kaska Dena elders Art John Sr. and others who knew him by the alias "Mickey Nelson" when he trapped and prospected in the Ross River region in west-central Yukon.

John Johnson

North's 1989 book Trackdown put forward his theory that Albert Johnson, Arthur Nelson, and a North Dakota repeat criminal by the name of John Johnson were one and the same person. John Johnson did time in San Quentin Prison and Folsom Prison, and his physical description is well documented and similar to the Mad Trapper's. North traced John Johnson's identity back to Norway. "Johnny Johnson" was born Johan Konrad Jonsen (1898) in Bardu Municipality in Norway, north of the Arctic Circle. However, the Mad Trapper's expensive dental work were not likely to belong to the criminal Johnson. Also, DNA tests involving John Johnson's great-nephew Ole Getz disproved that Johnny Johnson and the Mad Trapper were the same people.

Owen Albert Johnston

The Johnston family of Pictou, Nova Scotia, have long believed that Albert Johnson is actually Owen Albert Johnston, a relative who had left Pictou at the beginning of the Great Depression to find work in the United States. The family's last letter from Johnston was posted from Revelstoke, British Columbia, early in 1931. They never heard from him again. According to a 2009 Halifax radio interview a relative was arranging for DNA tests.

Sigvald Pedersen Haaskjold

Previous theories were challenged with the release of Mark Fremmerlid's book What Became of Sigvald Anyway. He proposed too many coincidences to ignore the possibility of Sigvald Pedersen Haaskjold from Norway emerging as Albert Johnson. Sigvald was last known as a highly self-sufficient 32-year-old in 1927, 4 1/2 years before the chase and death of Albert Johnson, who was estimated between 35 and 40 years. Sigvald had become obsessed with the notion that the authorities were still looking for him after evading conscription during the First World War. He had built a fortress-like cabin on Digby Island on the north coast of B.C. before disappearing. This author points out circumstantial evidence for this case.

== Contemporary analysis ==
=== Exhumation and forensic examination ===
A 2007 forensic examination found that Johnson was approximately 30 to 40 years old, had scoliosis, had undergone sophisticated dental work for the period, and had isotope results suggesting he had spent his youth in the U.S. Midwest.

It took place in August 2007 when a forensic team was assembled by Myth Merchant Films located and exhumed Johnson's grave near the cemetery in Aklavik, then conducted a modern forensic examination on his remains; these were presented in the documentary film The Hunt for the Mad Trapper and the book The Mad Trapper: Unearthing a Mystery by Barbara Smith.

This team found that isotope analysis of his teeth suggested he may have grown up in Scandinavia or the U.S. Midwest, that he had scoliosis which would have led to chronic back pain, that he was approximately 35 years of age, and that he had been struck multiple times in his final gun battle including his leg, thorax and a debilitating shot from behind through his pelvis. A spiral fracture of his femur supports the anecdote that a bullet had hit and exploded an ammunition pouch on his hip. His dental work was of very high quality for the time suggesting he was able to afford expensive state-of-the-art work at a major centre such as Chicago or New York. DNA samples were also obtained for comparison work.

After the examination his remains were re-interred with full religious rites by both the local priest and native elders, something that had not been afforded to him at his original burial.

=== Outcome ===
While many people had offered convincing circumstantial and anecdotal evidence that they were related to him, the DNA analysis ruled out all of the candidates and his identity remains a mystery.

In 2017, it was decided to attempt a familial DNA investigation; however, technical problems with the DNA eluded analysis until an adequate sequence was developed by Othram Inc. in 2021. Further investigation by Othram traced his ancestors to Sweden, linking him to multiple descendants of Gustaf Magnusson (1776–1853) and Britta Svensdotter (1781–1846), suggesting that he was either their descendant or the descendant of one of their close relatives. Many of his genetic matches traced their ancestry to the Swedish towns of Hånger, Kävsjö, and Kulltorp. As of July 2021, further DNA samples and family history were being sought from possible descendants to further the investigation.

== In popular culture ==
=== Films and music ===
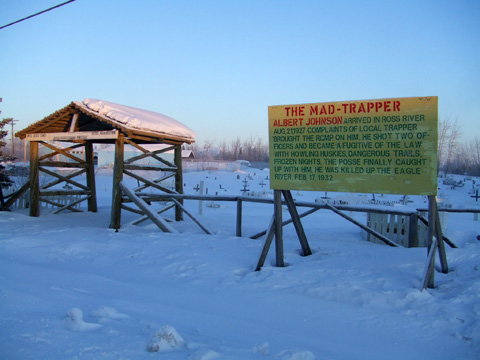
Sign in Aklavik

- In August 2007, Myth Merchant Films produced a documentary of the exhumation of Johnson's grave and the subsequent modern forensic examination seeking information about his identity. The documentary was released in 2009.
- The event is the subject of the songs "The Capture of Albert Johnson," by Wilf Carter, and "The Mad Trapper of Rat River", by Stanley G. Triggs on his 1961 album Bunkhouse and Forecastle Songs of the North West (Smithsonian Folkways Recordings).
- "Rat River Trapper", written and performed by Doug Hutton, was released on the 1974 RCMP tribute album Scarlet and Gold (Denali Records Ltd.).
- The Mad Trapper, a highly fictionalized film based on these events, was released in 1972, and in 1975 Challenge to Be Free was released. An U.S. production, it referred to Johnson's character merely as "Trapper", or in the theme song, "Trapper Man". It portrayed Johnson as a man who lived in peace and harmony with wild animals, similar to Johnny Appleseed and whose initial interference with other traps was due to rival trappers' inhumane techniques.
- Death Hunt, a 1981 film starring Charles Bronson as Albert Johnson and Lee Marvin as Constable Edgar Millen, is a fictionalized version of the story.

=== Books ===
- Rudy Wiebe, The Mad Trapper, 1980, Jackpine House Ltd., 186 pages, ISBN 0-88995-268-X
- Thomas York, Trapper, 1981, Avon Books, 476 pages, ISBN 0-380-63156-3
- Anderson, Frank W.; Downs, Art (1986). The Death of Albert Johnson, Mad Trapper of Rat River. Surrey, British Columbia, Canada: Heritage House. ISBN 978-1-89438-403-2 – via Internet Archive..
- Dick North, The Mad Trapper of Rat River, 2003, The Lyons Press, 338 pages, ISBN 1-59228-771-9
- Hélèna Katz, The Mad Trapper, 2004, Altitude Publishing Canada Ltd., 133 pages, ISBN 1-55153-787-7
- Dick North, The Man Who Didn't Fit In, 2005, The Lyons Press, 259 pages, ISBN 1-59228-838-3
- Barbara Smith, The Mad Trapper: Unearthing a Mystery, 2009, Heritage House Publishing Co., 160 pages, ISBN 1-894974-53-0
- Mark Fremmerlid, What Became of Sigvald Anyway? Was He The Mad Trapper of Rat River? 66 pages, ISBN 978-0-9784270-0-9
- Thomas P. Kelley, Rat River Trapper, 1972, Paper Jacks, 141 pages, ISBN 0-7737-7004-6
- Dick North, Trackdown, 1989, Macmillan of Canada, 202 pages, ISBN 0-7715-9209-4
- Ian Manook, Ravage, 2023, Éditions Paulsen, 352 pages, ISBN 9-782375-021958
