= Hottah Lake =

Lake in Northwest Territories, Canada

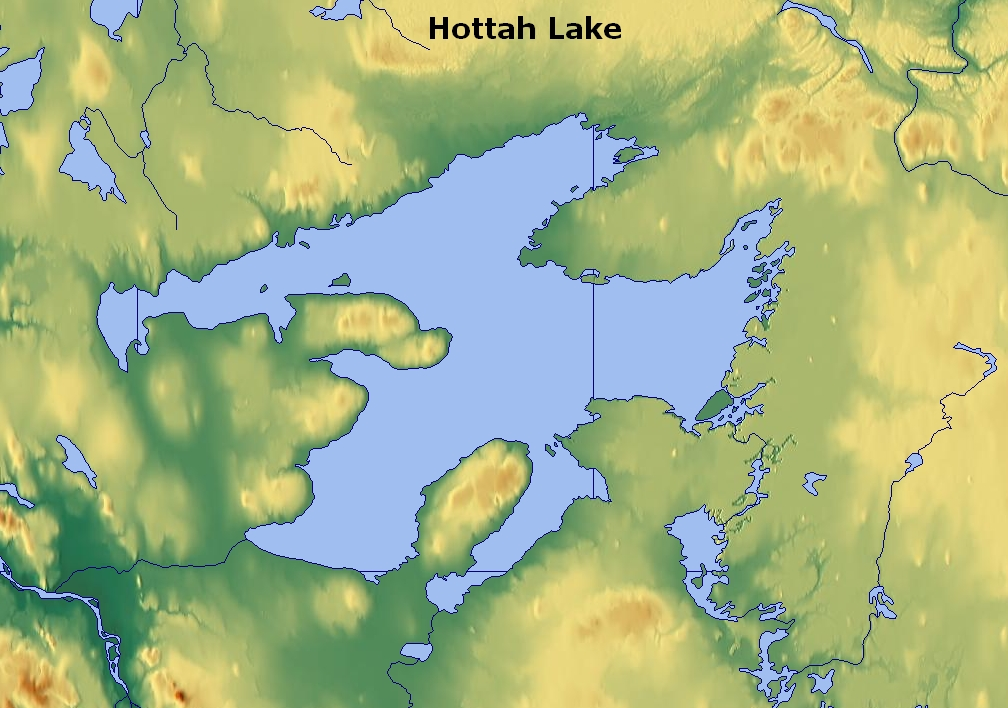
- This image shows Great Bear Lake and the surrounding region. The much smaller Hottah Lake is seen here as the largest body of water lying to the south-east of Great Bear Lake

- Location within Northwest Territories

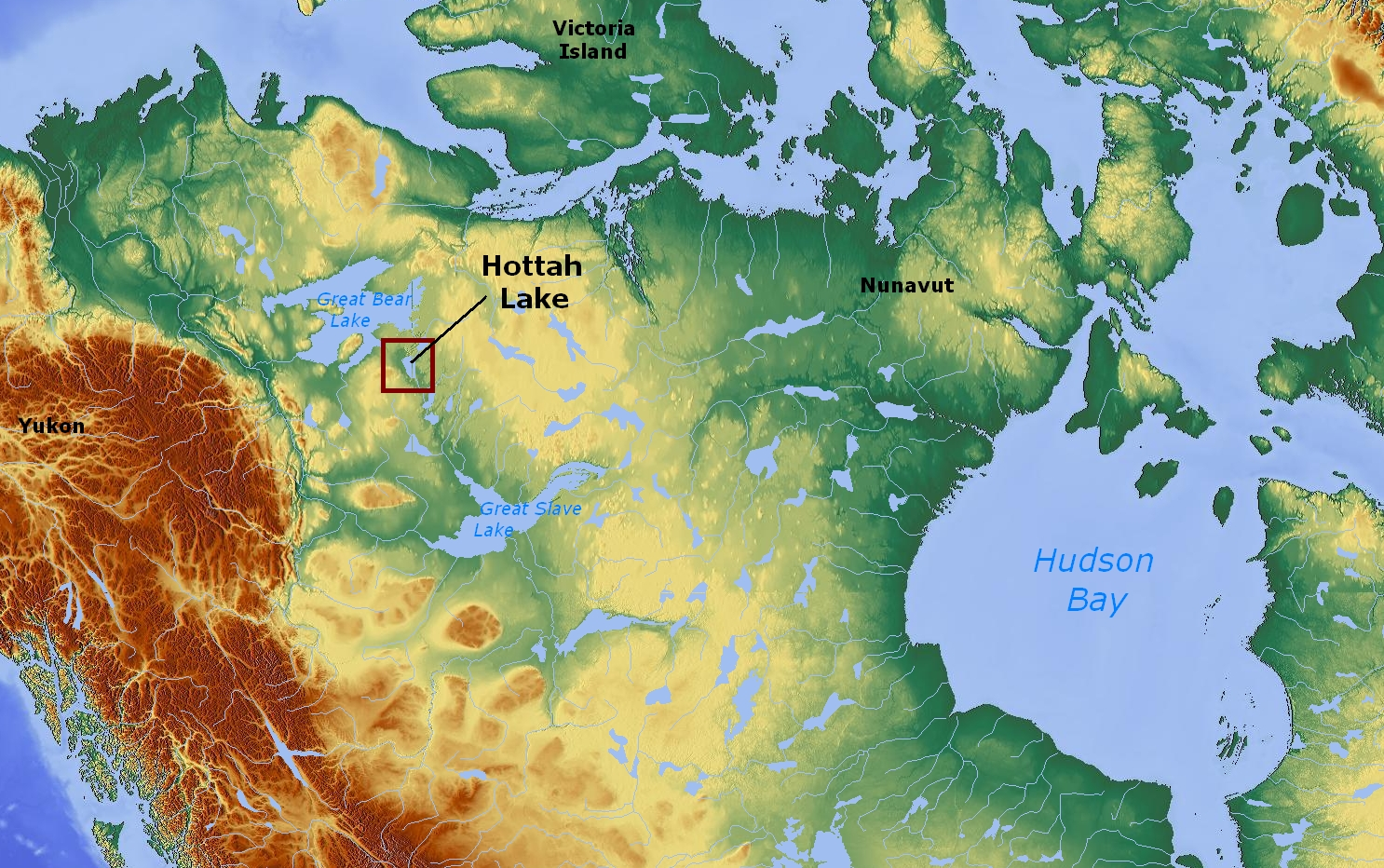
- Location: Northwest Territories
- Coordinates: 65°05′45.1″N 118°29′14.6″W
- Basin countries: Canada
- Surface area: 918 km^{2} (354 sq mi)
- Surface elevation: 180 m (590 ft)

Hottah Lake is the sixth largest lake in the Northwest Territories, Canada.

== Plane crash ==
On 8 November 1972, a medical evacuation aircraft piloted by Marten Hartwell crashed on a hillside near the lake. Hartwell broke both legs while the nurse, Judy Hill, and a pregnant Inuk woman named Neemee Nulliayok died. David Pisurayak Kootook also survived the crash but died after 20 days. Kootook was instrumental in the pair's survival but unlike Hartwell would not eat the flesh of the dead nurse.

== Legacy ==
When the Mars Curiosity rover discovered solid evidence of an ancient streambed on Mars from a pile of cemented smooth rocks (conglomerates), the project managers named one of the two rock outcrop sites Hottah (the other is named Link) after the lake.

== See also ==
- List of lakes of the Northwest Territories
- Hottah terrane
