= Mike Mazurki =

American actor and professional wrestler

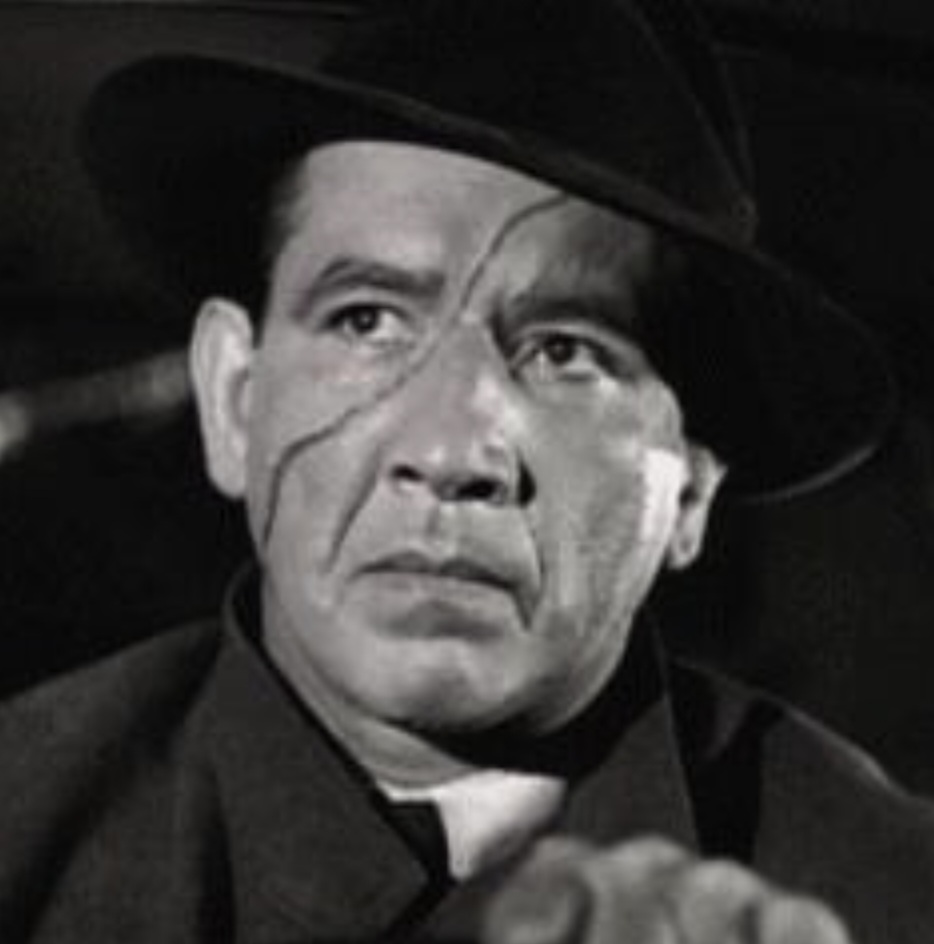
- Mazurki as Splitface in Dick Tracy (1945)
- Born: Markiian Yulianovych Mazurkevych; December 25, 1907; Kupczyńce, Kingdom of Galicia and Lodomeria, Austria-Hungary (now Ukraine)
- Died: December 9, 1990 (aged 82); Glendale, California, U.S.
- Education: Manhattan College; Fordham University Law School
- Occupations: Actor; professional wrestler
- Years active: 1934–1990
- Height: 6 ft 5 in (196 cm)
- Spouses: Jeanette Briggs (m. 1943; div. 1950); Sylvia Weinblatt (m. 1968)
- Children: 2

1st President of the Cauliflower Alley Club
- In office 1965–1990
- Succeeded by: Archie Moore

Mike Mazurki (December 25, 1907 – December 9, 1990, born Markiian Yulianovych Mazurkevych) (Note: Ukrainian: Маркіян Юліанович Мазуркевич, romanized: Markiian Yulianovych Mazurkevych) was a Ukrainian-American actor and professional wrestler who appeared in dozens of films. Although educated as an attorney, his hulking 6 ft 5 in (196 cm) presence, craggy face, and croaking voice had him often typecast as brainless athletes, tough guys, thugs, and gangsters. Memorable roles included Moose Malloy in Murder, My Sweet (1944), Splitface in Dick Tracy (1945), Yusuf in Sinbad the Sailor (1947), and "The Strangler" in Night and the City (1950). He was the founder and first president of the Cauliflower Alley Club.

== Early years ==
Mazurki was born Markiian Yulianovych Mazurkevych in the village of Kupczyńce (in present-day Kupchyntsi, Ternopil Raion), near what was then Tarnopol, Galicia, Austria-Hungary (now Ternopil, Ukraine).

Mazurki attended high school at the LaSalle Institute in Troy, New York. Upon graduation, he changed his name to "Mike". He played football and basketball at Manhattan College, where he graduated with a Bachelor of Arts degree in 1930.

After earning his bachelor's degree, Mazurki graduated from Fordham Law School and became an attorney. He later said he took up professional wrestling because he could earn around ten times what he could as a lawyer. Mazurki was also a professional football and basketball player.

== Career ==
Mazurki had trained as a professional wrestler, but turned to acting after serving as Mae West's bodyguard. Mazurki was discovered by Josef von Sternberg and given a bit part in his film The Shanghai Gesture (1941). This led to a long film and television career. Possibly his best-known role was as the slow-witted but dangerously obsessed thug Moose Malloy in the lurid film noir based on Raymond Chandler’s Phillip Marlowe novel Farewell My Lovely, Murder, My Sweet (1944). He portrayed the psychotic, knife-wielding murderer Splitface in the original Dick Tracy (1945). (Mazurki would play a cameo role, 45 years later, in the 1990 Warren Beatty film version of the same name.) He played a frightening, knuckle-cracking henchman in the noir Abandoned (1949), bone-crushing wrestler "The Strangler" in Night and the City (1950) (performing a grueling and highly realistic match against a professional Greco-Roman grappler), and had a role imitating the manner of a George Raft henchman in the Billy Wilder comedy, Some Like It Hot (1959). He continued to wrestle during his acting career. His slurred speech was reportedly due to a wrestling injury to his Adam's apple. Following the death of Victor McLaglen, Mazurki appeared in several films for John Ford.

In addition to his film work, Mazurki made guest appearances on many popular television shows, among them My Friend Flicka (as a wrestler facing Gene Evans's character "Rob McLaughlin"), The Untouchables, Bachelor Father, Daniel Boone, Gilligan's Island, The Munsters, I Dream of Jeannie, Bonanza, and Gunsmoke, to name just a few. In 1964, he played Cully Barstow, a yacht hand, in "The Case of the Missing Button", an episode of Perry Mason in which he threatened Mason and Paul Drake with a set of brass knuckles. He also played Arthur Jacks in the episode "The Case of the Deadly Verdict" (1963). He was a regular as well on the short-lived sitcom The Chicago Teddy Bears. In 1966–67, he performed as the caveman "Clon" in It's About Time.

In 1972, he landed his only starring role in a film as Trapper in Challenge to Be Free. As he aged, acting opportunities for Mazurki began to slow in the 1970s and 1980s; nevertheless, he continued working until his death on December 9, 1990. His final film role, that of "Don Taglianeti", is in the low-budget comedy Mob Boss, which was released just two months before he died. Along with his film and television appearances, Mazurki was seen in the hit Rod Stewart music video "Infatuation" (1984), playing the bodyguard protecting a woman (played by Kay Lenz) from a stalker (played by Stewart, whom he punches out). Mazurki later said that he got more fame in the making of this video than in any of the feature films or TV shows in which he'd starred.

== Filmography ==
- Belle of the Nineties (1934) as New Orleans Audience Admirer (uncredited)
- Black Fury (1935) as Security Force Applicant (uncredited)
- Each Dawn I Die (1939) as fellow prisoner (uncredited)
- The Last Alarm (1940) as Onlooker (uncredited)
- The Shanghai Gesture (1941) as The Coolie
- Dr. Renault's Secret (1942) as Rogell (uncredited)
- The Moon and Sixpence (1942) as Tough Bill (uncredited)
- That Other Woman (1942) as Thug (uncredited)
- Gentleman Jim (1942) as Jake Kilrain (uncredited)
- It Ain't Hay (1943) as Bouncer (uncredited)
- Prairie Chickens (1943) as Henchman Charlie (uncredited)
- Taxi, Mister (1943) as Henchman Joe
- Mission to Moscow (1943) as Russian Machinist Workman (uncredited)
- Bomber's Moon (1943) as Kurt (scenes deleted)
- Behind the Rising Sun (1943) as Japanese Wrestler (uncredited)
- Thank Your Lucky Stars (1943) as Olaf (uncredited)
- Swing Fever (1943) as Wrestler (uncredited)
- Henry Aldrich Haunts a House (1943) as The Goon (uncredited)
- Whistling in Brooklyn (1943) as Henchman on Ship (uncredited)
- Lost Angel (1943) as Fighter (uncredited)
- Shine On, Harvest Moon (1944) as Bouncer (uncredited)
- Summer Storm (1944) as Tall Policeman Bending Over Petroff (uncredited)
- The Canterville Ghost (1944) as Metropolus
- The Missing Juror (1944) as Cullie — Masseur (uncredited)
- The Princess and the Pirate (1944) as Pirate (uncredited)
- Murder, My Sweet (1944) as Moose Malloy
- The Horn Blows at Midnight (1945) as Bass Player / Humphrey Rafferty
- The Spanish Main (1945) as Erik Swaine
- Abbott and Costello in Hollywood (1945) as Klondike Pete
- Dick Tracy (1945) as 'Splitface'
- Dakota (1945) as "Bigtree' Collins
- The Thin Man Goes Home (1945) as First Man outside barber shop (uncredited)
- Live Wires (1946) as Patsy 'Pat' Clark
- Mysterious Intruder (1946) as Harry Pontos
- The French Key (1946) as Sam Cragg
- Sinbad the Sailor (1947) as Yusuf
- Killer Dill (1947) as Little Joe
- Unconquered (1947) as Bone
- Nightmare Alley (1947) as Bruno
- I Walk Alone (1947) as Dan
- Relentless (1948) as Jake
- The Noose Hangs High (1948) as Chuck
- Neptune's Daughter (1949) as Mac Mozolla
- Come to the Stable (1949) as Sam
- Rope of Sand (1949) as Pierson
- The Devil's Henchman (1949) as Rhino
- Abandoned (1949) as Hoppe
- Samson and Delilah (1949) as Leader of Philistine soldiers
- Night and the City (1950) as The Strangler
- Dark City (1950) as Sidney Winant
- He's a Cockeyed Wonder (1950) as 'Lunk' Boxwell
- Pier 23 (1951) as Ape Danowski
- Criminal Lawyer (1951) as 'Moose' Hendricks
- Ten Tall Men (1951) as Roshko
- The Light Touch (1951) as Charles
- My Favorite Spy (1951) as Monkara
- The Egyptian (1954) as Foreman, House of Death (uncredited)
- New York Confidential (1955) as Arnie Wendler
- New Orleans Uncensored (1955) as Big Mike
- Blood Alley (1955) as Big Han
- Davy Crockett: King of the Wild Frontier (1955) as Bigfoot Mason
- Davy Crockett and the River Pirates (1956) as Bigfoot Mason
- Kismet (1955) as Chief Policeman
- Rikidozan Otoko no Tamashi (1956) as Max Logan
- Comanche (1956) as Flat Mouth
- Around the World in 80 Days (1956) as Hong Kong Drunk
- Man in the Vault (1956) as Louie
- Hell Ship Mutiny (1957) as Ross
- The Man Who Died Twice (1958) as Rak
- The Buccaneer (1958) as Tarsus
- Some Like It Hot (1959) as Spats's henchman #1
- Alias Jesse James (1959) as Dirty Dog Tough (uncredited)
- The Facts of Life (1960) as First Husband in Motel Room
- Swingin' Along (1961) as Bookie
- The Errand Boy (1961) as Blonde 'Movie Siren'
- Pocketful of Miracles (1961) as Big Mike
- Zotz! (1962) as Igor
- Five Weeks in a Balloon (1962) as Slave Captain
- Donovan's Reef (1963) as Sgt. Monk Menkowicz
- It's a Mad, Mad, Mad, Mad World (1963) as Miner bringing medicine to his wife
- 4 for Texas (1963) as Chad
- Cheyenne Autumn (1964) as Senior First Sergeant Wichowski
- The Disorderly Orderly (1964) as Moving Van Passenger (uncredited)
- 7 Women (1966) as Tunga Khan — Bandit Leader
- The Adventures of Bullwhip Griffin (1967) as Mountain Ox
- Which Way to the Front? (1970) as Rocky (uncredited)
- The Centerfold Girls (1974) as The Caretaker
- Challenge to Be Free (1975) as Trapper
- Won Ton Ton, the Dog Who Saved Hollywood (1976) as Studio Guard
- Paesano: A Voice in the Night (1977) as Bodyguard
- The Magic of Lassie (1978) as Apollo
- The One Man Jury (1978) as Kayo's Handler
- Gas Pump Girls (1979) as Moiv
- Alligator (1980) as Gatekeeper
- The Man with Bogart's Face (1980) as Himself
- ...All the Marbles (1981) as Referee in Chicago (uncredited)
- Doin' Time (1985) as Bruno
- Amazon Women on the Moon (1987) as Dutch (segment "Reckless Youth")
- Dick Tracy (1990) as Old Man at hotel
- Mob Boss (1990) as Don Taglianeti (final film role)

== Television ==
- My Friend Flicka — episode — The Old Champ (1956) as Hercules
- Have Gun – Will Travel — episode — Ella West (1958) as Breed
- Official Detective "The Policeman's Gun" (1958) as Banning
- Have Gun – Will Travel — episode — Love's Young Dream (1960) as Power
- The Texan - episode - Captive Crew (1960) as Kale
- Perry Mason — episode — The Case of the Counterfeit Crank (1961) as Cully Baxter
- Have Gun – Will Travel — episode — Don't Shoot the Piano Player (1962) as Jo Jo
- Perry Mason — episode — The Case of the Missing Button (1964) as Cully Barstow
- Daniel Boone — episode — Lac Duquesne (1964) as Akasheta (uncredited)
- The Munsters — episode — Knock Wood, Here Comes Charlie (1964) as Leo 'Knuckles' Kraus
- Wagon Train — episode — The Duncan McIvor Story (1964) as Lance Corp. Otto Moller
- Laredo — episode — Pride of the Rangers (1965) as Pvt. Percy Flower
- Gilligan's Island — episode — Friendly Physician (1966) as Igor/Ginger Grant
- It's About Time — TV series 1966 — 1967 — 26 episodes
- Daniel Boone — episode — Gabriel (1966) as El Toro
- F Troop — episode — Our Hero, What's His Name (1966) as Geronimo
- Rango — episode — Diamonds Look Better Around Your Neck Than a Rope (1967) as Jake Downey
- Batman — episode — The Wail of the Siren (1967) as Allegro
- I Dream of Jeannie — episode — Jeannie and the Great Bank Robbery (1967) as Girard
- The Beverly Hillbillies -The Great Tag-Team Match (1968) as Wrestler
- Bonanza — episode — Stage Door Johnnies (1968) as Big Man
- Bonanza — episode — Dead Wrong (1969) as Big Jack
- Land of the Giants - episode - Giants, and All That Jazz (1969) as Loach (Season 2, Episode 6)
- My Three Sons - episode - What Did You Do Today, Grandpa? (1969) as Hugo (Season 9, Episode 17)
- Adam-12 — episode — Bank Robbery (1970) as Claude Terry (Season 2, Episode 24)
- Gunsmoke — episode — Trafton (1971) as Whale
- Mannix — episode — Days Beyond Recall (1971) as Kony
- Kung Fu — episode — Superstition (1973) as Hannibal
- The Rockford Files — episode — A Fast Count (1978) as Choo-Choo (uncredited)
- Charlie's Angels — episode — Mother Angel (1978) as Robbins
- Fantasy Island — episode — Naughty Marietta/The Winning Ticket (1983) as Swamp Rat
- Fantasy Island — episode — Love Island/The Sisters (1983) as Ugh
