= Peter R. Hunt =

British director, editor and producer

- Born: Peter Roger Hunt; 11 March 1925; London, England
- Died: 14 August 2002 (aged 77); Santa Monica, California, U.S.
- Occupations: Film director; film editor; film producer
- Years active: 1940–1991
- Known for: James Bond series
- Military career
- Allegiance: United Kingdom
- Branch: British Army
- Service years: 1942–1947
- Rank: Staff Sergeant
- Conflicts: World War II

Peter Roger Hunt (11 March 1925 – 14 August 2002) was a British director, editor and producer of film and television, best known for his work on the James Bond film series, first as an editor and then as a second unit director. He finally served as director for On Her Majesty's Secret Service. His work on the series helped pioneer an innovative, fast-cutting editing style.

== Biography ==
As an infantryman, Hunt served in Salerno, Italy, in 1943.

After undertaking several forms of employment, Hunt worked as an assistant cutter for Alexander Korda, before working as an assembling editor on The Man Who Watched Trains Go By (1952). After several B-movies, he served as the supervising editor on A Hill in Korea (1956). The following year, Hunt edited The Admirable Crichton (directed and co-written by Lewis Gilbert), becoming good friends with John Glen. Hunt continued his collaboration with Gilbert on films such as Ferry to Hong Kong (1959) and Sink the Bismarck! (1960).

In the 1960s, Hunt signed on as an editor on the first James Bond film, Dr. No (1962) and he edited From Russia with Love (1963) and Goldfinger (1964). On those three films, Hunt developed an editing technique in which he utilized quick cutting, allowing camera swings during action and inserts interleaving other elements. He also worked with Harry Saltzman and Albert R. Broccoli on the Bob Hope film Call Me Bwana (1963) and with Saltzman and a few other Bond veterans on the non-Eon thriller The Ipcress File (1965). Call Me Bwana was the only film produced by the James Bond production company Eon Productions that was not a Bond film until 2014.

After editing Thunderball (1965), Hunt asked to direct You Only Live Twice (1967), but was passed over in favor of Lewis Gilbert. Although Hunt initially quit in protest, Broccoli and Saltzman persuaded him to stay as second unit director on the understanding that he would be promoted to director in a future Eon film. Saltzman and Broccoli were impressed with his quick cutting skills and felt he had set the style for the series. Hunt directed the "Little Nellie" sequence of the film. When Gilbert passed on the opportunity to direct On Her Majesty's Secret Service (1969), Broccoli and Saltzman selected Hunt as director. Hunt also asked for the position during the production of Chitty Chitty Bang Bang (1968) and he brought along with him many crew members, including cinematographer Michael Reed and editor John Glen. Hunt was concerned to put his mark on the production – "I wanted it to be different than any other Bond film would be. It was my film, not anyone else's."

On Her Majesty's Secret Service was the last James Bond film on which Hunt worked. Hunt was asked to direct numerous other Eon Bond films — including Live and Let Die, The Spy Who Loved Me and For Your Eyes Only — but always declined. In 1971, Hunt directed episodes of The Persuaders! with Tony Curtis and Bond star Roger Moore; he also directed Moore in Gold (1974) and Shout at the Devil (1976) with Lee Marvin. Although approached by Kevin McClory, he refused to direct Never Say Never Again (1983) afraid that Broccoli would consider him disloyal. His last films included Wild Geese II (1985) and the Cannon Film thrillers, Death Hunt (1981) and Assassination (1987), both starring Charles Bronson. He also directed the epic television miniseries The Last Days of Pompeii (1984).

== Personal life ==
Hunt spent his later years living in the United States. He was gay and lived with his partner, Nicos Kourtis, from 1975 until his death. He died of heart failure on 14 August 2002 at his home in Santa Monica, California, at the age of 77.

== Filmography ==
=== Film ===
Year	Title	Editor	Director	Other	Notes
1940	The Thief of Bagdad	No	No	Yes	As associate editor
1943	The Life and Death of Colonel Blimp	No	No	Yes	As associate editor
1949	Badger's Green	No	No	Yes	As associate editor
1950	They Were Not Divided	No	No	Yes	As associate editor
1950	Gone to Earth	No	No	Yes	As associate editor
1951	Cheer the Brave	No	No	Yes	As associate editor
1952	The Man Who Watched Trains Go By	Yes	No	No	
1953	Wheel of Fate	No	No	Yes	As sound editor
1953	House of Blackmail	No	No	Yes	As assistant editor
1954	Orders Are Orders	No	No	Yes	As assistant editor
1954	Burnt Evidence	No	No	Yes	As assistant editor
1954	Stranger From Venus	Yes	No	No	
1956	The Secret Tent	Yes	No	No	
1956	Doublecross	Yes	No	No	
1956	A Hill in Korea	Yes	No	No	
1957	The Admirable Crichton	Yes	No	Yes	As second unit director
1958	Next to No Time	Yes	No	No	
1958	A Cry from the Streets	Yes	No	No	
1959	Ferry to Hong Kong	Yes	No	No	
1960	Sink the Bismarck!	Yes	No	No	
1960	There Was a Crooked Man	Yes	No	No	
1961	The Greengage Summer	Yes	No	No	
1961	On the Fiddle	Yes	No	No	
1962	H.M.S. Defiant	Yes	No	No	
1962	Dr. No	Yes	No	No	
1963	Call Me Bwana	Yes	No	No	
1963	From Russia with Love	Yes	No	No	
1964	Goldfinger	Yes	No	Yes	As second unit director
1965	Thunderball	Yes	No	Yes	As second unit director
1965	The Ipcress File	Yes	No	No	
1966	Strange Portrait	Yes	No	No	
1967	You Only Live Twice	Yes	No	Yes	As second unit director
1968	Chitty Chitty Bang Bang	No	No	Yes	As title sequence director
1969	Arthur! Arthur!	Yes	No	No	
1969	On Her Majesty's Secret Service	No	Yes	No	
1974	Gold	No	Yes	No	
1976	Shout at the Devil	No	Yes	No	
1977	Gulliver's Travels	No	Yes	No	
1980	Rough Cut	No	Uncredited	No	Replaced by Don Siegel
1980	Night Games	Yes	No	No	
1981	Death Hunt	No	Yes	No	
1983	The Jigsaw Man	No	No	Yes	As second unit director
1985	Wild Geese II	No	Yes	No	
1986	Hyper Sapien: People from Another Star	No	Yes	No	
1987	Assassination	No	Yes	No	

=== Television ===
Year	Title	Editor	Director	Notes
1971	The Persuaders!	Yes	Yes	Episode: "Chain of Events"
1972	Shirley's World		Yes	Episode: "Always Leave Them Laughing"
1978	The Beasts Are on the Streets		Yes	Television film
1983	Philip Marlowe, Private Eye		Yes	2 episodes
1984	The Last Days of Pompeii		Yes	4 episodes
1991	Eyes of a Witness		Yes	Television film
