= Line of purples =

Edge of visible color

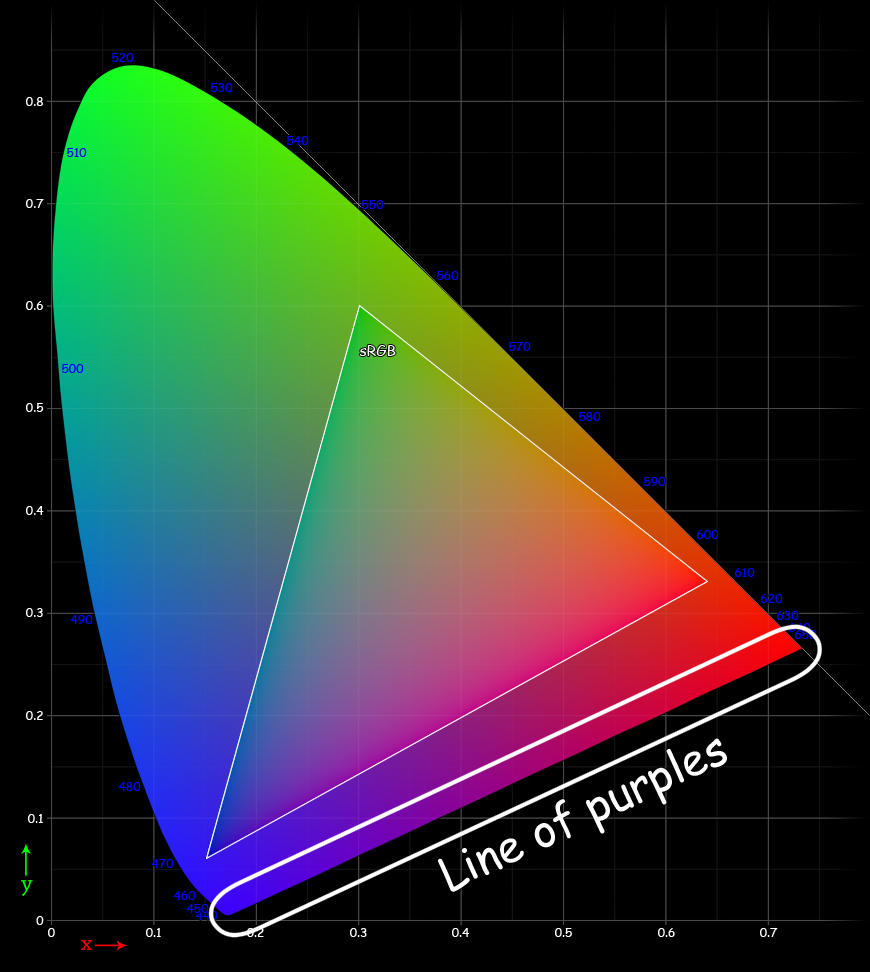
The line of purples circled on the CIE chromaticity diagram

In color science, the line of purples or purple boundary is the locus on the edge of the chromaticity diagram formed between extreme spectral red and violet. Except for these endpoints of the line, colors on the line are non-spectral (no monochromatic light source can generate them). Rather, every color on the line is a unique mixture in a ratio of fully saturated red and fully saturated violet, the two spectral color endpoints of visibility on the spectrum of pure hues. Colors on the line and spectral colors are the only ones that are fully saturated in the sense that, for any point on the line, no other possible color being a mixture of red and violet is more saturated than it.

Unlike spectral colors, which may be implemented, for example, by the nearly monochromatic light of a laser, with precision much finer than human chromaticity resolution, colors on the line are more difficult to depict. The sensitivity of each type of human cone cell to both spectral red and spectral violet, being at the opposite endpoints of the line and at the extremes of the visible spectrum, is very low. (See luminosity function.) Therefore, common purple colors are not highly bright.

The line of purples, a theoretical boundary of chromaticity, is distinct from "purples", a more general denomination of colors, which also refers to less than fully saturated colors (see shades of purple and shades of pink for examples) that form the interior of a triangle between white and the line of purples in the CIE chromaticity diagram.

== In color spaces ==
In 3-dimensional color spaces the line, if present, becomes a 2-dimensional shape. For example, in the CIE XYZ it is a planar sector bounded by black–red and black–violet rays. In systems premised on pigment colors, such as the Munsell and Pantone systems, boundary purples might be absent because the maximally possible lightness of a pigment vanishes when its chromaticity approaches the line, such that purple pigments near the line are indistinguishable from black.

The RGB color model, although theoretically capable of approximating the colors of the line because it is an additive system, usually practically fails because of the limitations of the light source used. The boundary of sRGB (pictured) runs approximately parallel to the line, connecting the primaries red and (color wheel) blue, and thus purples near the line are absent from the gamut of sRGB. Magenta ink, which is one of CMYK's primaries, is also very distant from the line for the reason explained above. The wide-gamut RGB color space approximates the colors on the line better, but devices capable of displaying colors with this enhanced system are prohibitively expensive for ordinary consumers.

== Table of highly saturated purples ==
Most of the names of the purple colors in the table below do not denominate colors on the line of purples, but instead are slightly less than maximally colorful, i.e. saturated.

Hues along the line of purples
Names	Sample	Hue	Complementary
Far spectral violet, ≈ Blue (CIE RGB)	×	≈ 260°	≈ Yellow/Lime
Non-spectral violet		≈ 270°	≈ Lime
Purple 5P (Munsell) for V = 3, C = 38	×	≈ 280°	≈ Chartreuse green
Electric purple (sRGB)		285°	≈ Harlequin
Phlox		292°	⋮
Fuchsia / Magenta (sRGB secondary)		300°	Green (sRGB primary)
Shocking Pink		311°	Green (traditional)/Emerald
Process magenta		320°	⋮
Magenta dye, ≈ Tyrian purple		327°	⋮
Rose		330°	≈ Spring green
Raspberry, ≈ Ruby		337°	⋮
Red (NCS)		345°	Green (NCS)
Crimson (may be partially outside sRGB)		≈ 345°	≈ Green 5G (Munsell)
Carmine	×	≈ 350°–0°	Turquoise/Cyan
Red 5R (Munsell) for V = 4, C = 24	×	≈ 354°	⋮
Extreme spectral red / Red (CIE RGB)	×	≈ 359°	Cyan

× Approximations of colors outside sRGB.

== See also ==
- Complementary wavelength
- Purple versus violet

== Notes and references ==
- Kenneth L. Kosanke, B. J. Kosanke, The Illustrated Dictionary of Pyrotechnics, p. 72
