= Spectral color =

Color evoked by a single wavelength of light in the visible spectrum

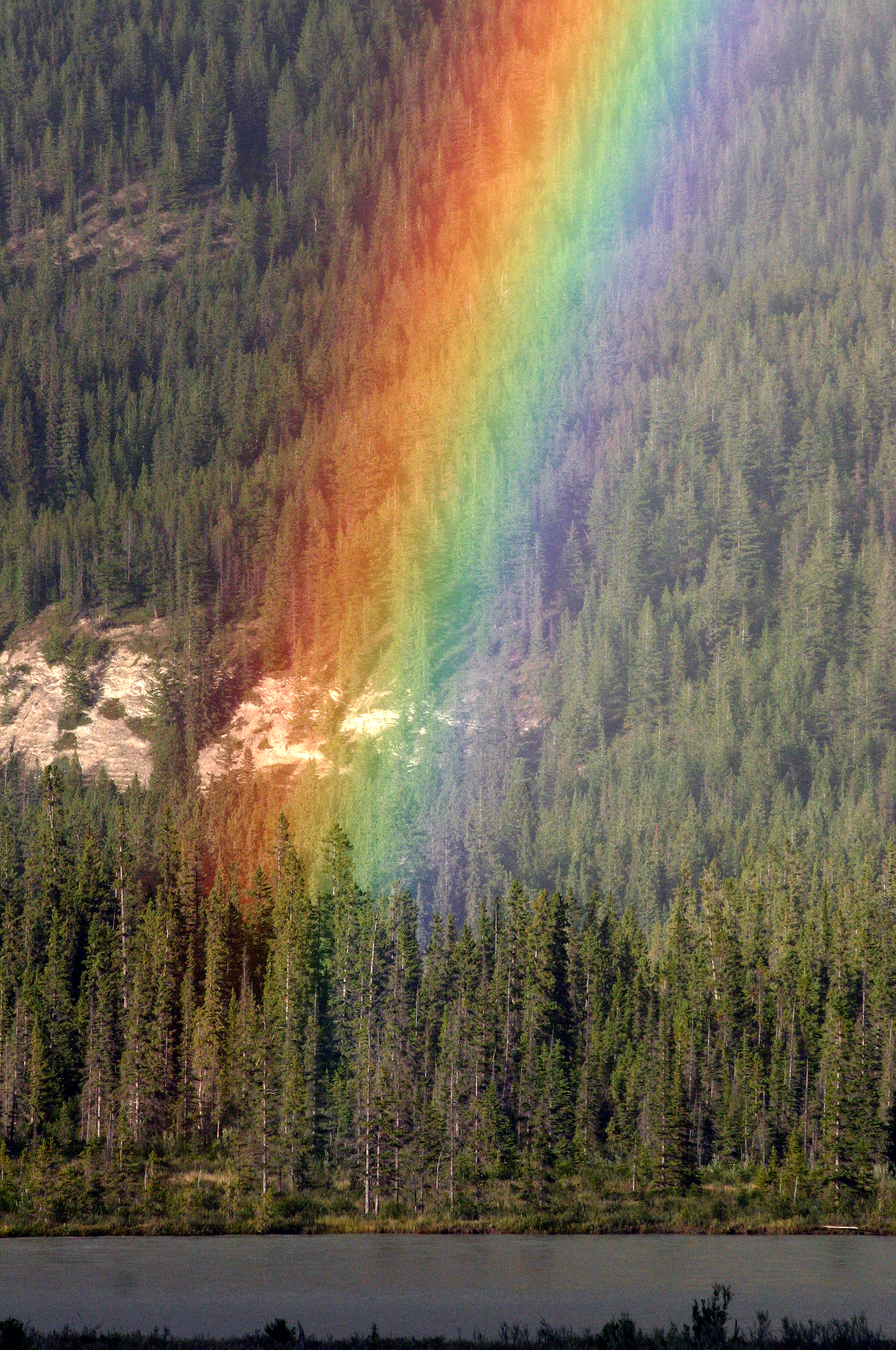
A rainbow is a decomposition of white light into all of the spectral colors.

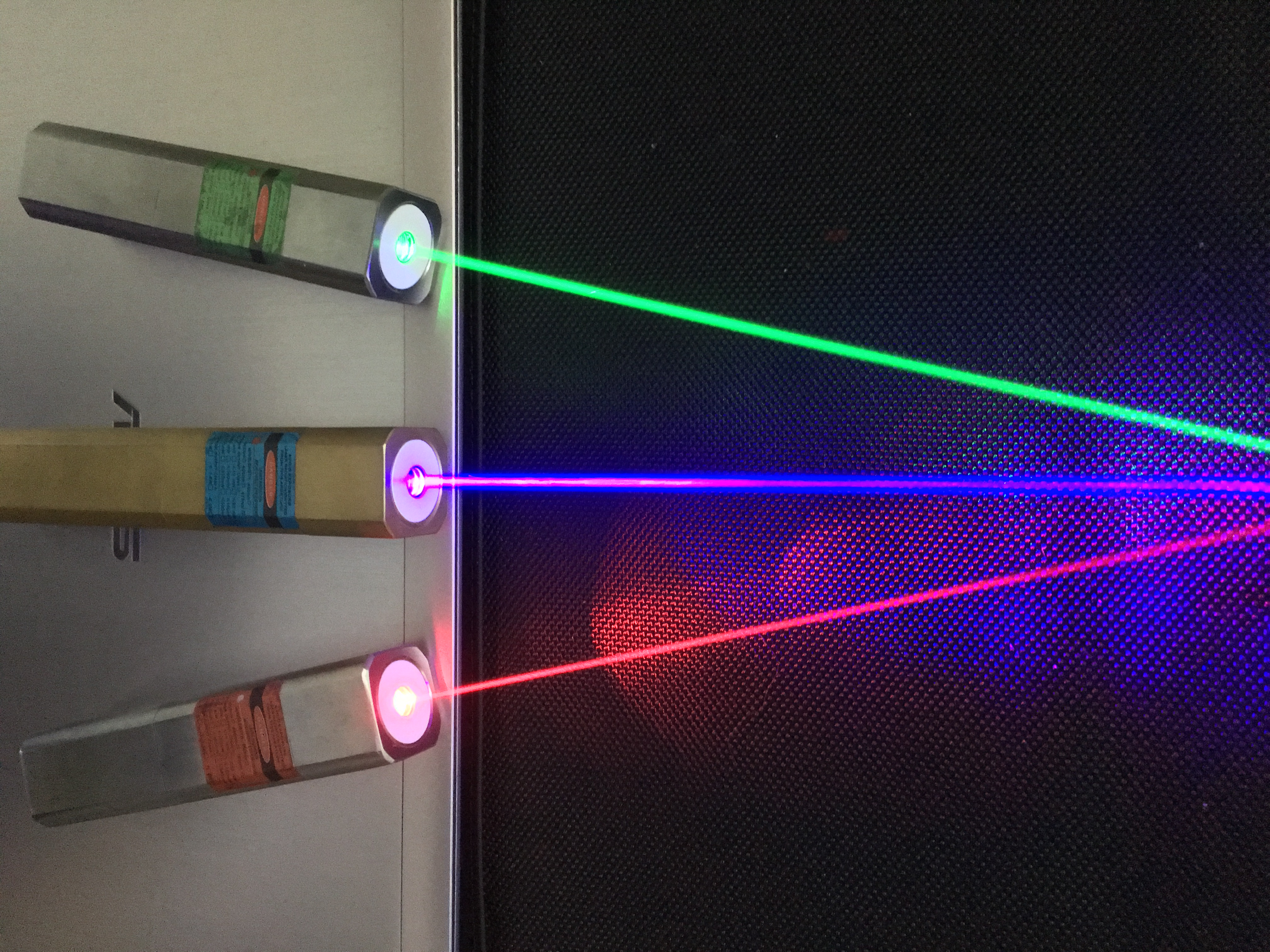
Laser beams are monochromatic light, thereby exhibiting spectral colors.

A spectral color is a color that is evoked by monochromatic light, i.e. either a spectral line with a single wavelength or frequency of light in the visible spectrum, or a relatively narrow spectral band (e.g. lasers). Every wave of visible light is perceived as a spectral color; when viewed as a continuous spectrum, these colors are seen as the familiar rainbow. Non-spectral colors (or extra-spectral colors) are evoked by a combination of spectral colors.

== In color spaces ==
CIE xy chromaticity diagram The spectrum colors are the colors on the horseshoe-shaped curve on the outside of the diagram. All other colors are not spectral: the bottom line is the line of purples, whilst within the interior of the diagram are unsaturated colors that are various mixtures of a spectral color or a purple color with white, a grayscale color. White is in the central part of the interior of the diagram.

In color spaces which include all, or most spectral colors, they form a part of boundary of the set of all real colors. When considering a three-dimensional color space (which includes luminance), the spectral colors form a surface. When excluding luminance and considering a two-dimensional color space (chromaticity diagram), the spectral colors form a curve known as the spectral locus. For example, the spectral locus of the CIE xy chromaticity diagram contains all the spectral colors (to the eye of the standard observer).

A trichromatic color space is defined by three primary colors, which can theoretically be spectral colors. In this case, all other colors are inherently non-spectral. In reality, the spectral bandwidth of most primaries means that most color spaces are entirely non-spectral. Due to different chromaticity properties of different spectral segments, and also due to practical limitations of light sources, the actual distance between RGB pure color wheel colors and spectral colors shows a complicated dependence on the hue. Due to the location of R and G primaries near the 'almost flat' spectral segment, RGB color space is reasonably good with approximating spectral orange, yellow, and bright (yellowish) green, but is especially poor in reproducing the visual appearance of spectral colors in the vicinity of central green, and between green and blue, as well as extreme spectral colors approaching IR or UV.

Spectral colors are universally included in scientific color spaces such as CIE 1931, but industrial and consumer color spaces/models such as sRGB, CMYK, and Pantone, do not typically include any spectral colors. Exceptions include Rec. 2020, which uses three spectral colors as primaries (and therefore only includes precisely those three spectral colors), and color spaces such as the ProPhoto RGB color space which use imaginary colors as primaries.

In color spaces such as CIELUV, a spectral color has maximal saturation. In Helmholtz coordinates, this is described as 100% purity.

=== In dichromatic color spaces ===
In dichromatic color vision there is no distinction between spectral and non-spectral colors. Their entire visible gamut can be represented by spectral colors. (Note: This is true for dichromats with photoreceptor cells with overlapping spectral sensitivity curves. If the spectral sensitivity curves do not overlap, then all colors (except the ones that only excite one type of conecell) would be non-spectral. However, there are no known vision systems where the cones' spectral sensitivity curves do not overlap.)

== Spectral color terms ==
The spectrum is often divided into color terms or names, but aligning boundaries between color terms to a specific wavelength is very subjective.

The first person to decompose white light and name the spectral colors was Isaac Newton, in the 1660s. Early in the study of radiometry, Newton was not able to measure the wavelength of the light, but his experiments were repeated contemporarily to estimate wavelengths where his color term boundaries probably lay. Newton's color terms included red, orange, yellow, green, blue, indigo, and violet; this color sequence is still used to describe spectral colors colloquially and a mnemonic for it is commonly known as "Roy G. Biv".

In modern divisions of the spectrum, indigo is often omitted and cyan is often included. Some have argued that Newton's indigo would be equivalent to modern blue, and his blue equivalent to cyan. However, a more recent explanation is that Newton was working by analogy with the musical scale. In the table below, note how wavelength is not proportional to a perceptually uniform hue scale. On the other hand, Newton's sections include five which are approximately uniform in size as they would have physically appeared in the diffracted spectrum, and two which were approximately half the size of the others, namely orange and indigo. This corresponds in size and location to the five whole tones and two semitones of the musical scale in Dorian mode. In contrast, the sections in the ISCC-NBS spectrum vary greatly in wavelength range, but are more consistent in the hue degree range. Both instances deviate from the basic color terms used in English, only some of which are spectral colors.

The table below includes several definitions where the spectral colors have been categorized in color terms. The "Approximate appearance" column displays the color with the same OKLCh hue and lightness as the corresponding spectral color for that wavelength, with maximal sRGB saturation, given a spectrum of equal radiant power and with the highest brightness as to, when projected onto sRGB, still have maximal saturation within this color gamut. Gamut mapping is necessary because displays cannot produce all, if any, spectral colors (a display with sRGB gamut and D65 whitepoint is assumed for this approximation). The colors at the ends of the spectrum are shown as dark since the cone cells in the eye are progressively less sensitive to light as the extremes of the visible spectrum are approached.

Spectral color classifications
Wavelength (nm)	Approximate appearance	Newton	ISCC-NBS	Malacara	CRC Handbook
Wavelength (nm)	Approximate appearance	1700	1943	2011	2006
380		Violet	Violet	Violet	Violet
390		Violet	Violet	Violet	Violet
400		Violet	Violet	Violet	Violet
410		Violet	Violet	Violet	Violet
420		Violet	Violet	Violet	Violet
430		Indigo	Violet	Blue	Violet
440		Indigo	Blue	Blue	Violet
450		Blue	Blue	Blue	Blue
460		Blue	Blue	Blue	Blue
470		Blue	Blue	Blue	Blue
480		Blue	Blue	Blue	Blue
490		Green	Blue-green	Blue	Blue
500		Green	Green	Cyan	Green
510		Green	Green	Cyan	Green
520		Green	Green	Green	Green
530		Yellow	Green	Green	Green
540		Yellow	Green	Green	Green
550		Yellow	Yellow-green	Green	Green
560		Yellow	Yellow-green	Green	Green
570		Yellow	Yellow-green	Yellow	Yellow
580		Orange	Yellow	Orange	Yellow
590		Orange	Orange	Orange	Orange
600		Orange	Orange	Orange	Orange
610		Orange	Red	Orange	Orange
620		Red	Red	Orange	Red
630		Red	Red	Red	Red
640		Red	Red	Red	Red
650		Red	Red	Red	Red
660		Red	Red	Red	Red
670		Red	Red	Red	Red
680		Red	Red	Red	Red
690		Red	Red	Red	Red
700			Red	Red	Red
710			Red	Red	Red
720			Red	Red	Red
730			Red	Red	Red
740					Red

== Extra-spectral colors ==
Among some of the colors that are not spectral colors are:

- Grayscale (achromatic) colors, such as white, gray, and black.
- Any color obtained by mixing a gray-scale color and another real color (either spectral or not), such as brown (a mixture of orange and black or gray).
- Red-violet colors, which include colors in the line of purples (such as magenta and rose), and other variations of purple and red.
- Impossible colors, which cannot be seen under normal viewing of light, such as over-saturated colors or colors that are seemingly brighter than white.
- Metallic colors which reflect light by effect.
