= Manganese violet =

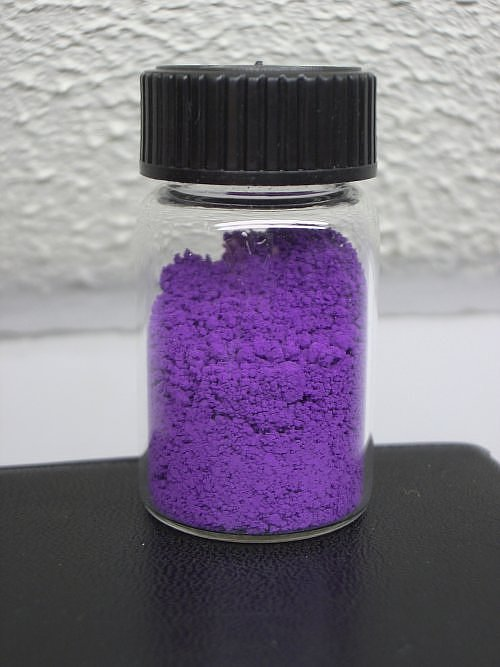

Names
- Other names: Ammonium manganese(III) pyrophosphate; C.I.: 77742; Pigment Violet 16

Identifiers
CAS Number	10101-66-3
3D model (JSmol)	Interactive image
ChemSpider	141372
ECHA InfoCard	100.030.221
EC Number	233-257-4
PubChem CID	160915
UNII	72M48QQV8Q
CompTox Dashboard (EPA)	DTXSID70889526
- InChI: InChI=1S/Mn.H3N.H4O7P2/c;;1-8(2,3)7-9(4,5)6/h;1H3;(H2,1,2,3)(H2,4,5,6)/q+3;;/p-3 Key: UHHXUPJJDHEMGX-UHFFFAOYSA-K
- SMILES: [N+H4].[Mn+3].O=P([O-])([O-])OP([O-])([O-])=O

Properties
Chemical formula	NH_{4}MnP_{2}O_{7}
Molar mass	246.885
Appearance	violet solid
- Except where otherwise noted, data are given for materials in their standard state (at 25 °C [77 °F], 100 kPa). Infobox references

Manganese violet is the inorganic compound with the formula NH_{4}MnP_{2}O_{7}. As implied by its name and composition, it is a purple, inorganic pigment. Because it is often impure, the pigment's hue is varied. Notable artists who have used the pigment include Claude Monet, who relied on manganese violet in his Rouen Cathedral series to further his exploration of shadows. Beyond the artistic community, manganese violet has been used in cosmetics to color products like lipstick and eyeshadow.

== History ==
The pigment was originally named Nürnberg violet, and little is known about its early history beyond its creation in 1866 by E. Leykeuf. The first documented production of the pigment was in 1890 by Messers Winsor and Newton (currently known as Winsor & Newton). In the Winsor & Newton 1892 catalog, both permanent violet and permanent mauve were listed. The two were distinguished by the company in 1896 when permanent mauve was described as phosphate of Manganese (which is another name for manganese violet). In 1898, the paint supplier Reeves listed permanent violet and permanent mauve as the same color.

== Synthesis and structure ==
The compound can be generated by combining manganese dioxide, phosphoric acid, and ammonium dihydrogenphosphate. For the synthesis from Mn(III) oxide, an idealized equation follows:

1/_{2} Mn_{2}O_{3} + (NH_{4})H_{2}PO_{4} + H_{3}PO_{4} → (NH_{4})Mn(P_{2}O_{7}) + 2.5 H_{2}O

The pigment has two polymorphs: α- and β-forms. Both are stable to about 340 °C. The optical properties of manganese violet arise from the distorted octahedral sites. The infrared spectroscopy, reflectance spectrum, and fluorescence spectroscopy can be found on ColourLex.

According the X-ray crystallography, both polymorphs of manganese violet have similar structures. The feature octahedral Mn(III) centers, which are distorted by Jahn-Teller effect, as expected for a high spin (quintet state) d^{4} ions.

== Pigment characteristics ==
Manganese violet is a fine, vibrant purple pigment that is synthetically generated. It exhibits exceptional permanence and high lightfastness.

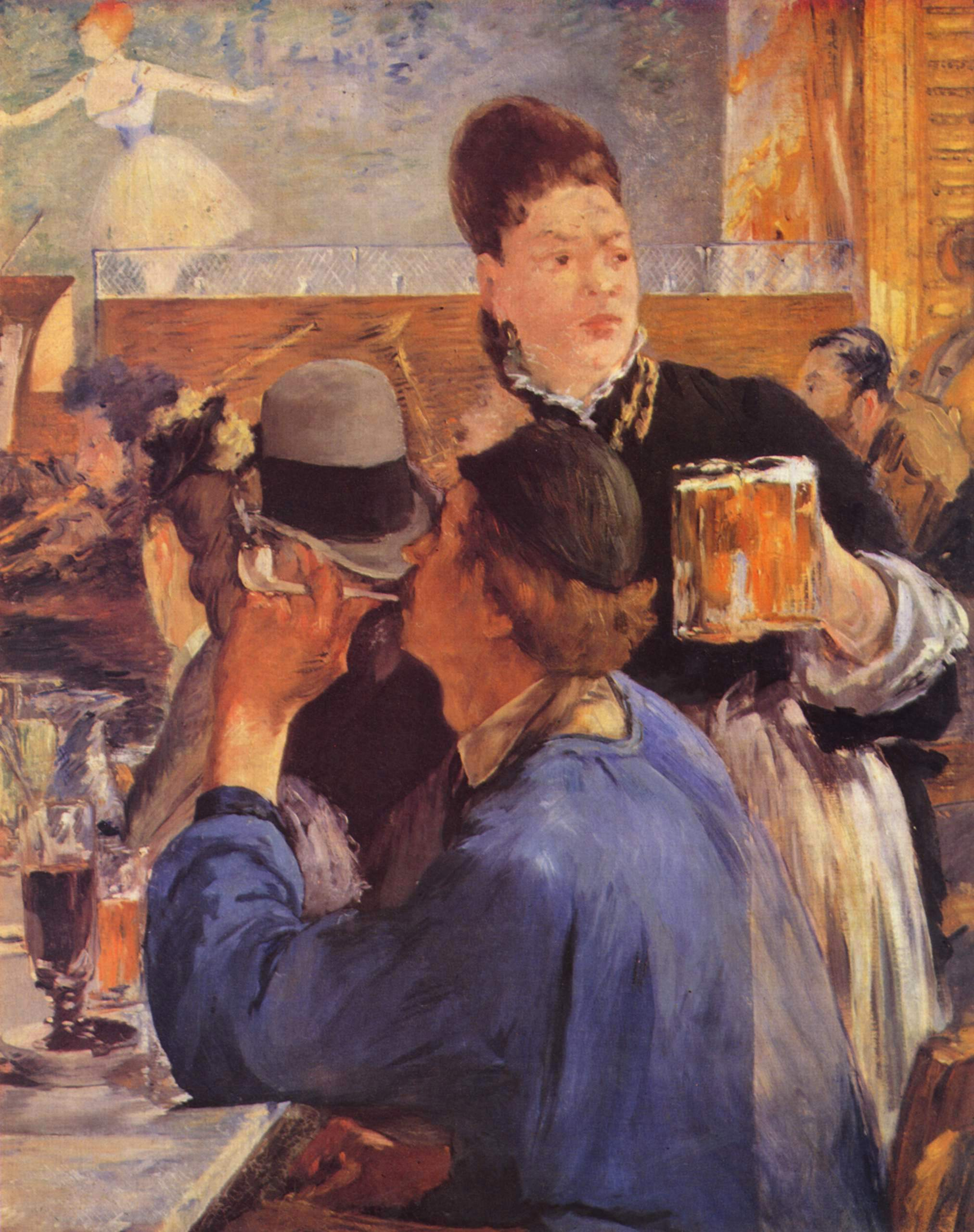
The Waitress was created by Édouard Manet in 1879.

Some artists historically avoided manganese violet because of they found its color to be dull. Variances in visual characteristics can arise from impurities. The visual characteristics of manganese violet remain a source of contention among the artistic community. Some sources claim that manganese violet is actually a more accurate violet hue than previous pigments like cobalt violet, which has a redder tone. Conversely, some sources assert that manganese violet (as well as cobalt violet) should not be categorized as violet according to modern color measurements.

== Artistic use ==
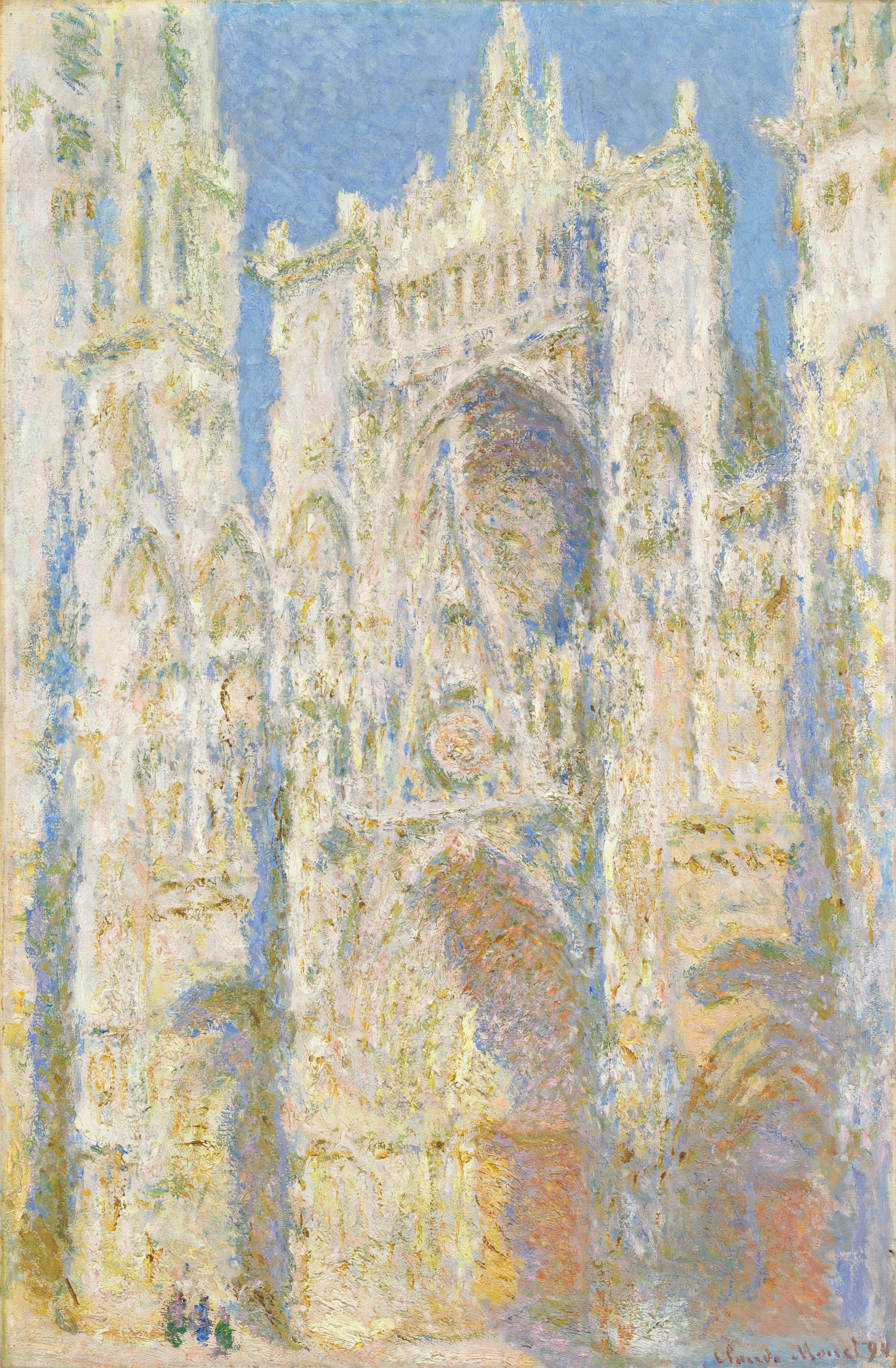
The Rouen, Cathedral, West Facade, Sunlight was created by Claude Monet in 1894 as another piece of the Rouen Cathedral series.

The manganese violet pigment is compatible with many artistic techniques; however, it is incompatible with fresco and stereochromy. The pigments' popularity was short lived within the artistic community because of its dullness and poor hiding power.

A number of nineteenth-century artists used the pigment when representing shadows. In Édouard Manet's The Waitress, manganese violet was used to create the red or purple colors. Claude Monet was an avid proponent of manganese violet's usage for shadows. Monet was quoted saying "I have finally discovered the true color of the atmosphere. It's violet. Fresh air is violet. Three years from now, everyone will work in violet." Impressionists used violet in place of black, which they argued was not found in nature. In Monet's Rouen Cathedral series, he utilized diverse colors to display how the perception of the same cathedral changes based on the lighting during the course of the day. In The Rouen Cathedral, West Facade, Sunlight and The Portal of Rouen Cathedral in the Morning Light, Monet manipulated the shadows through using manganese violet and other pigments to represent the time of the day.

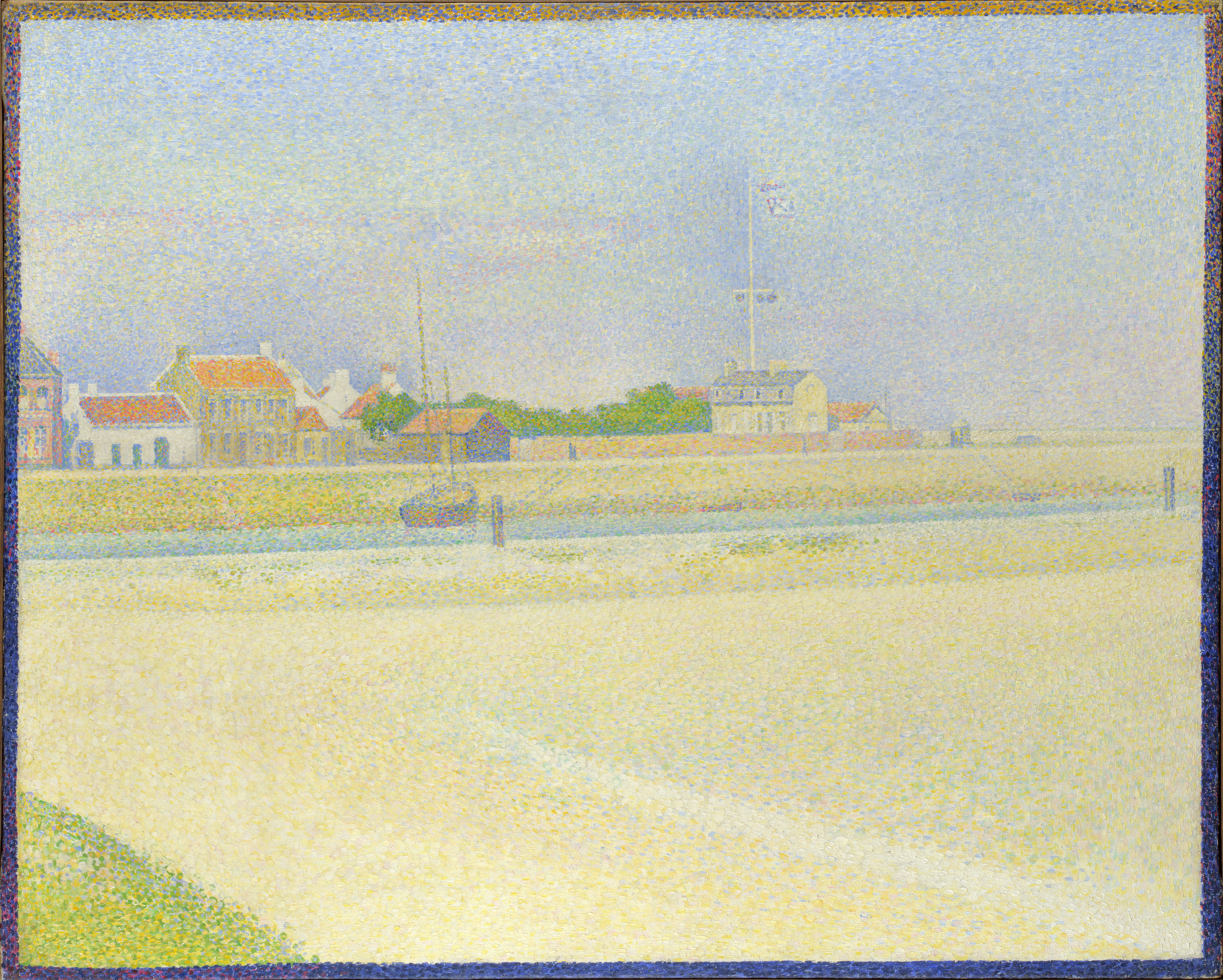
The Channel of Gravelines, Grand Fort-Philippe was created by Georges Seurat in 1890.

Georges Seurat also employed manganese violet in his paintings, though he used it sparingly because he saw it as impure. He tended to use what he regarded as pure pigments, such as cobalt blue, French ultramarine, and lead white. For many of his works, Seurat would combine other pure pigments to create a violet hue and, consequently, he would only utilize impure pigments like manganese violet for specific purposes. In Seurat's painting Channel of Gravelines, Grand Fort-Philippe, for example, manganese violet was used in the border. There is speculation that Seurat utilized manganese violet in the border because of its low tinting power. In comparison to manganese violet, pure pigments and their mixtures have high tinting powers, which may have been undesirable in this case; therefore, Seurat opted to use manganese violet for this painting.

== Cosmetic use ==
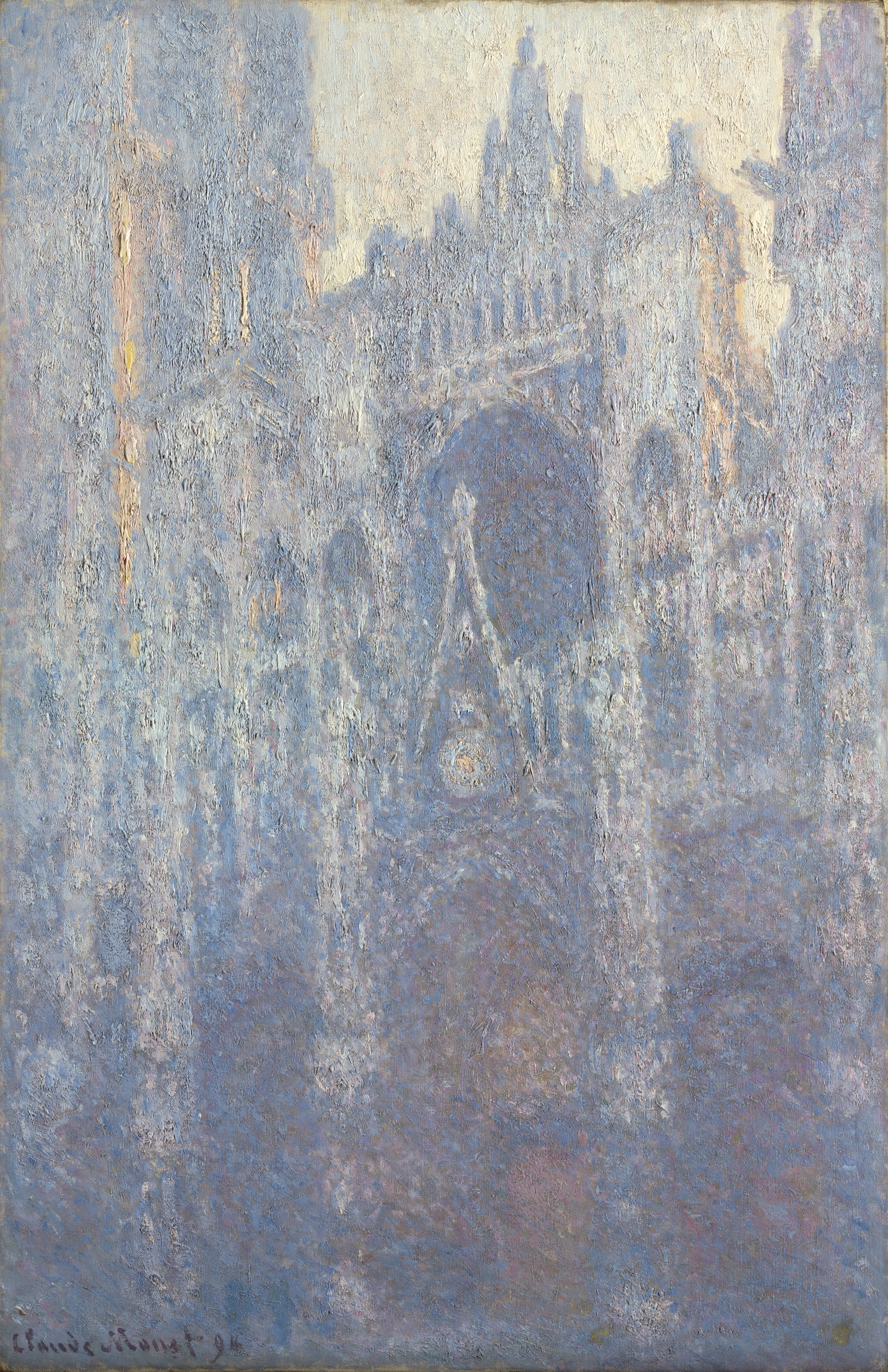
The Portal of Rouen Cathedral in Morning Light was created by Claude Monet in 1894 as a part of the Rouen Cathedral series.

Beyond the artistic community, manganese violet is used various cosmetics such as lipstick and eye products. The United States categorizes it as a safe compound for products used around the eyes such as eyeshadow. Additionally, the pigment is often used in lipstick to counter brighter pigments. Health concerns have been raised about manganese violet and other metal pigments in cosmetics.

== See also ==
- List of inorganic pigments
- Metal toxicity
