= ProPhoto RGB color space =

Photographic color space developed by Kodak

ProPhoto RGB
- Reference Output Medium Metric RGB
- CIE 1931 xy chromaticity diagram showing the chromaticities enclosed by the ProPhoto RGB color space and location of the primaries. The D50 white point is shown in the center. The areas of the triangle that are outside the colored area are imaginary colors.
- Abbreviation: ROMM RGB
- Native name: Reference Output Medium Metric RGB; ISO 22028-2:2013; ANSI/I3A IT10.7666-2002
- Status: Published
- Latest version: 2013; April 2013; 12 years ago
- Organization: Kodak; IEC; ANSI
- Committee: ISO/TC 42 (TC)
- Authors: Kodak
- Base standards: RGB
- Domain: Color space, color model
- Website: ISO: www.iso.org/standard/56591.html; ANSI: webstore.ansi.org/Standards/I3A/ANSII3AIT1076662002

Comparison of some RGB and CMYK colour gamuts on a CIE 1931 xy chromaticity diagram

The ProPhoto RGB color space, also known as ROMM RGB (Reference Output Medium Metric), is an output referred RGB color space developed by Kodak. It offers an especially large gamut designed for use with photographic output in mind. The ProPhoto RGB color space encompasses over 90% of possible surface colors in the CIE L*a*b* color space, and 100% of likely occurring real-world surface colors documented by Michael Pointer in 1980, making ProPhoto even larger than the Wide-gamut RGB color space. The ProPhoto RGB primaries were also chosen in order to minimize hue rotations associated with non-linear tone scale operations. One of the downsides to this color space is that approximately 13% of the representable colors are imaginary colors that do not exist and are not visible colors.

When working in color spaces with such a large gamut, it is recommended to work in 16-bit color depth to avoid posterization effects. This will occur more frequently in 8-bit modes as the gradient steps are much larger.

There are two corresponding scene space color encodings known as RIMM RGB (Reference Input Medium Metric) intended to encode standard dynamic range scene space images, and ERIMM RGB intended to encode extended dynamic-range scene space images.

== Development ==
The development of the ProPhoto RGB and other color spaces is documented in an article summarizing a presentation by one of its developers Geoff Wolfe at Kodak, currently senior research manager at Canon Information Systems Research Australia, at the IS&T/SPIE Color Imaging Conference in 2011.

== Encoding primaries ==
Color	CIE x	CIE y	CIE X	CIE Y	CIE Z
Red	0.734699	0.265301	0.79767	0.28804	0.00000
Green	0.159597	0.840403	0.13519	0.71188	0.00000
Blue	0.036598	0.000105	0.03134	0.00009	0.82491
White	0.345704	0.358540	0.96420	1.00000	0.82489

== Viewing environment ==
- Luminance level is in the range of 160–640 cd/m^{2}.
- Viewing surround is average.
- There is 0.5–1.0% viewing flare.
- The adaptive white point is specified by the chromaticity values for CIE Standard illuminant D50 ($x = 0.345704$, $y = 0.358540$).
- The image color values are assumed to be encoded using flareless (or flare corrected) colorimetric measurements based on the CIE 1931 Standard Colorimetric Observer.

== Encoding function ==
$$X'_\mathrm{ROMM} = I_\mathrm{MAX} \cdot \begin{cases} 0; & X_\mathrm{ROMM} < 0.0 \\ 16\cdot X_\mathrm{ROMM}; & 0.0 \le X_\mathrm{ROMM} < E_t \\ X_\mathrm{ROMM}^{1/1.8}; & E_t \le X_\mathrm{ROMM}<1.0 \\ 1; & X_\mathrm{ROMM} \ge 1.0
\end{cases}$$

where

$$X = R,\, G,\, or\, B$$

and

$I_\mathrm{MAX}$ is the maximum integer value used in the encoding function (e.g. 255 for 8-bit configuration)

and

$$E_t = 16^{1.8/(1-1.8)} = 2^{-9} = 1/512 = 0.001953125$$
