= Wide-gamut RGB color space =

Large gamut of color space developed by Adobe

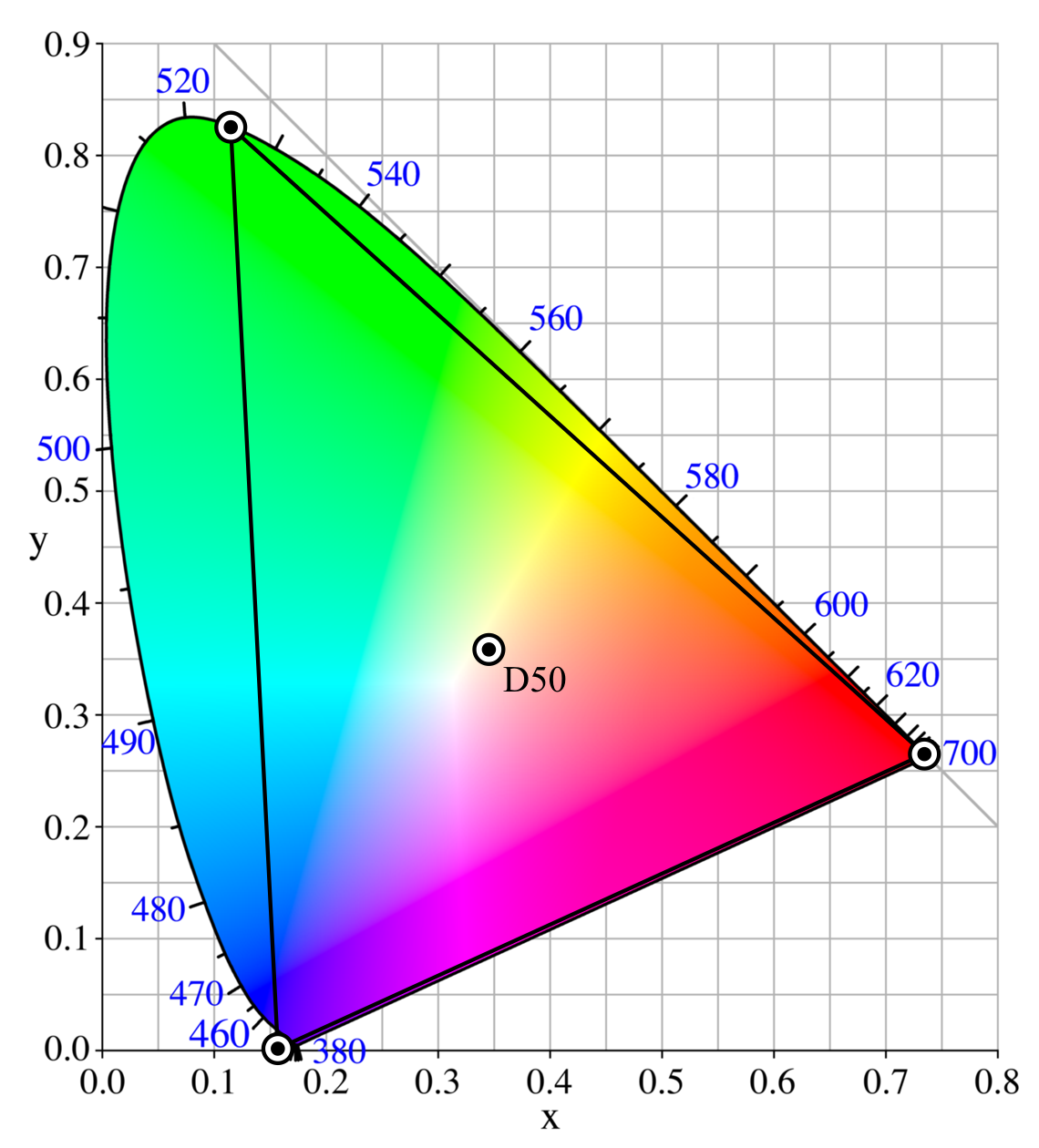
CIE 1931 xy chromaticity diagram showing the gamut of the wide-gamut RGB color space and location of the primaries. The D50 white point is shown in the center.

The wide-gamut RGB color space (or Adobe Wide Gamut RGB) is a color space developed by Adobe Systems, that offers a large gamut by using pure spectral primary colors. It is able to store a wider range of color values than sRGB or Adobe RGB color spaces. As a comparison, the wide-gamut RGB color space encompasses 77.6% of the visible colors specified by the CIELAB color space, while the standard Adobe RGB color space covers just 52.1% and sRGB covers only 35.9%.

When working in color spaces with such a large gamut, it is recommended to work in 16-bit per channel color depth to avoid posterization effects. This will occur more frequently in 8-bit per channel modes as the gradient steps are much larger.

As with sRGB, the color component values in wide-gamut RGB are not proportional to the luminances. Similar to Adobe RGB, a gamma of 2.2 is assumed, without the linear segment near zero that is present in sRGB. The precise gamma value is 563/256, or 2.19921875.

The white point corresponds to D50. The chromaticities of the primary colors and the white point are as follows:

Color	CIE x	CIE y	Wavelength
Red	0.7347	0.2653	700 nm
Green	0.1152	0.8264	525 nm
Blue	0.1566	0.0177	450 nm
White point	0.3457	0.3585	
