= Liverpool College of Art =

Art building in Liverpool, England

Coordinates: 53.3995°N 2.9715°W

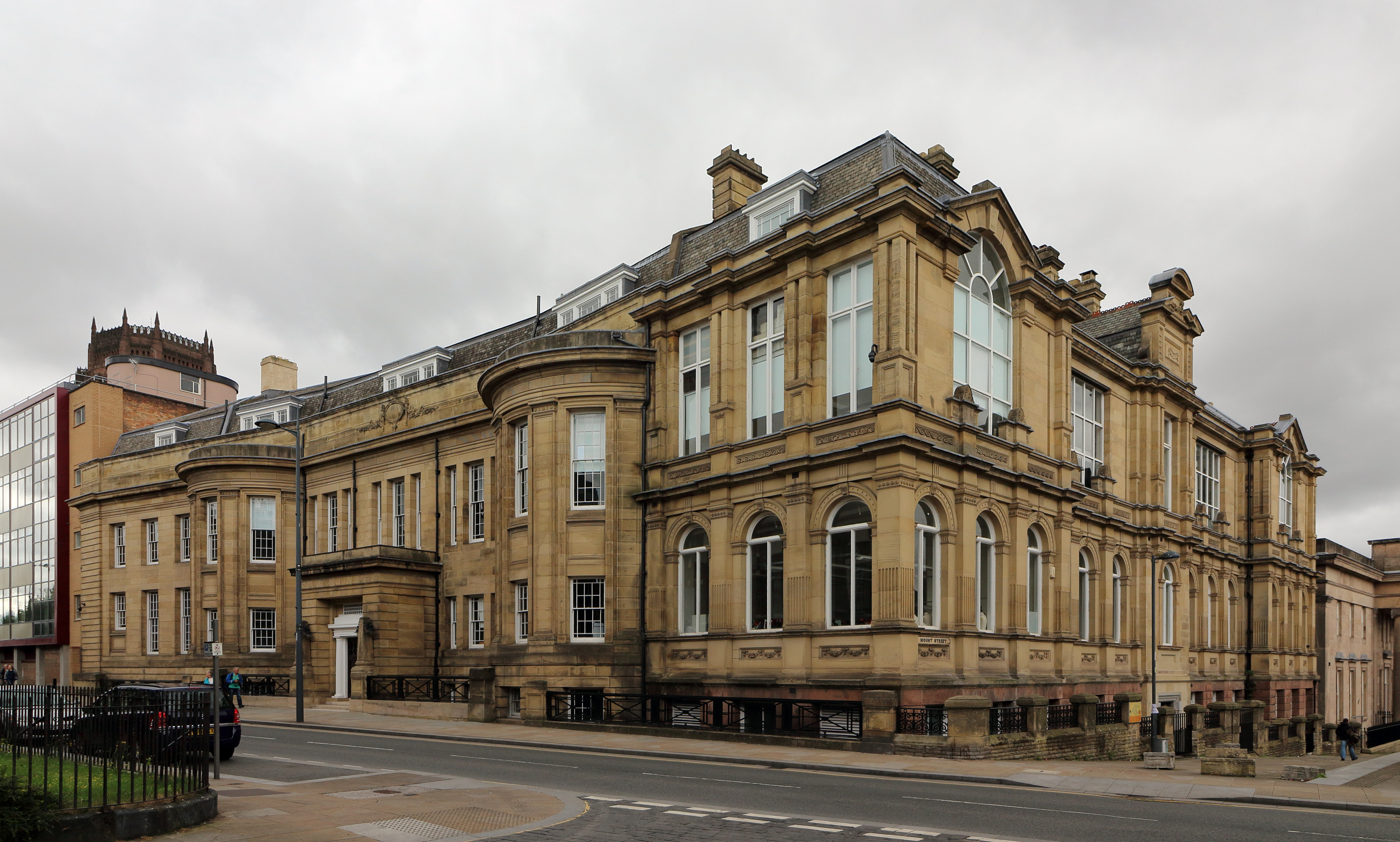
View of the former Liverpool College of Art building from Blackburne Place. The building is now occupied by LIPA.

Liverpool College of Art has an unbroken history dating back to 1825, making it the oldest English school of art outside London. From 1883 it was located at 68 Hope Street, Liverpool, England, in a building designed by Thomas Cook, which is now Grade II listed. Cook's design was the winner from a competition which attracted 96 entries. The cost was £12,000, which was mostly provided by one of the school's Board of Directors. An extension, by architects Willink & Thicknesse, who also designed the Cunard Building, was added in 1910. William Willink stepped down from his role as Director of Technical Instruction at the school to carry out the commission. The extension abutted 68 Hope Street and fronted the school's preexisting premises on Mount Street (later the Liverpool Institute High School for Boys, and subsequently, LIPA, the Liverpool Institute for Performing Arts). The cost was £19,852. In March 2012, the adjoining Liverpool Institute for Performing Arts (LIPA) announced that it had purchased the former Liverpool College of Art building for £3.7million to expand its teaching space.

== History of the institution ==
What had previously been known as Liverpool School of Art was granted the title of Regional College of Art for Liverpool by the Ministry of Education in 1949. In 1970 Liverpool College of Art became part of the newly-formed Liverpool Polytechnic, which achieved university status as Liverpool John Moores University in 1992. The university's School of Art and Design moved to new premises at the Art and Design Academy in 2008.

Amongst its former students are John Lennon, Cynthia Lennon, John Meirion Morris, Maurice Cockrill, Ray Walker, Stuart Sutcliffe, Margaret Chapman, Ruth Duckworth, Phillida Nicholson and Bill Harry. Sir James Stirling studied there while working at an architect's office after leaving school. In 1975, Clive Langer, Steve Allen, Tim Whittaker, Sam Davis, Steve Lindsey, John Wood and Roy Holt (a mix of Fine Art students and tutors at the college) founded seminal 'art rock' band Deaf School and went on to sign a record deal with Warner Bros Records US after being 'discovered' by former Beatles publicist and head of Warner Bros UK at the time Derek Taylor. Deaf School are acknowledged as catalysts of the post-Beatles musical revival in the city.

Staff at the Liverpool College of Art in the late 1950s (at the time of John Lennon and Stuart Sutcliffe) included Walter Norman, Julia Carter Preston, Arthur Ballard, Charles Burton, Nicholas Horsfield, George Mayer-Marton, E. S. S. English, Alfred K. Wiffen, Austin Davies, Philip Hartas, and the college's then-principal W. L. Stevenson.

June Furlong was a life model at the school for 48 years, from 1947 to 1995, having also modelled at the Slade School of Fine Art, Goldsmiths College and the Royal College of Art and for Augustus John, Lucian Freud, Frank Auerbach.

=== Notable alumni ===
- George Adamson
- Kay Anderson
- Arthur Ballard
- Richard Paton - Rainbow Glass Studios, London
- Margaret Blundell
- Dorothy Bradford
- Margaret Chapman
- Helen Clapcott
- Maurice Cockrill
- May Louise Greville Cooksey
- Ruth Duckworth
- Edith Edmonds
- Jane Greenwood – costume designer
- Bill Harry
- Shirley Hughes – author and illustrator
- John Francis Kavanagh
- Edward Kelly
- Ronald William "Josh" Kirby
- Clive Langer
- John Lennon – musician
- John Meirion Morris
- Steve Lindsey
- Alexander Mackenzie
- Lilian Rathmell
- Isabel Rawsthorne
- Stanley Reed
- Sidney Sime
- Phoebe Stabler – sculptor
- James Stirling (architect)
- Stuart Sutcliffe
- Norman Thelwell – cartoonist
- Ray Walker
- Geoffrey Heath Wedgwood
- John Wood – design theorist

== See also ==
- Art school
- Art Education
- List of art schools
- List of art schools in Europe
