= Silicate mineral paint =

Paint coats with mineral binding agents

Silicate mineral paints or mineral colors are paint coats with mineral binding agents. Two relevant mineral binders play a role in the field of colors: Lime, and silicate.

Under the influence of carbon dioxide, lime-based binders carbonate and water silicate-based binders solidify. Together they form calcium silicate hydrates.

Lime paints (aside from Fresco-technique) are only moderately weather resistant, so people apply them primarily in monument preservation. Mineral colors are commonly understood to be silicate paints. These paints use potassium water glass as binder. They are also called water glass paints or Keimfarben (after the inventor).

Mineral silicate paint coats are considered durable and weather resistant. Lifetimes exceeding a hundred years are possible. The city hall in Schwyz and "Gasthaus Weißer Adler" in Stein am Rhein (both in Switzerland) received their coats of mineral paint in 1891, and facades in Oslo from 1895 or in Traunstein, Germany from 1891.

== History ==
Alchemists in their pursuit of the philosopher's stone (to manufacture gold) found glassy shimmering pearls in fireplaces. Sand mixed with potash and heat coalesced into pearls of water glass. Small round panes of water glass were first industrially manufactured for use as windows in the 19th century by Van Baerle in Gernsheim and Johann Gottfried Dingler in Augsburg. Johann Nepomuk von Fuchs made the first attempts to create paints with water glass.

Around 1850, the painters Kaulbach and Schlotthauer applied facade paints of the Pinakothek in Munich. Due to use of earth pigments, which cannot be silicated, the paintings washed out of the water glass.

In 1878, the craftsman and researcher Adolf Wilhelm Keim patented mineral paints. Since then, they have been manufactured by the successor company Keimfarben in Diedorf near Augsburg.

Keim depended on V. van Baerle as the source of water glass. Keim also attempted to manufacture silicate paints himself. His experiments took years to mature, but he finally achieved good results. The Silinwerk van Baerle in Gernsheim near the Rhine river and Keimfarben in Diedorf near Augsburg are well-known manufacturers.

The impetus for Keim's intense research originated from King Ludwig I. of Bavaria. The art-minded monarch was so impressed by the colorful lime frescoes in northern Italy that he desired to experience such artwork in his own kingdom Bavaria. But the weather north of the alps - known to be significantly more harsh - destroyed the artful paintings within short time. Therefore, he issued an order to Bavarian science to develop paint with the appearance of lime but greater durability.

== Properties ==
Mineral paint contains inorganic colorants, and potassium-based, alkali silicate (water glass), also known as potassium silicate, liquid potassium silicate, or LIQVOR SILICIVM. A coat with mineral colors does not form a layer but instead permanently bonds to the substrate material (silicification).

The result is a highly durable connection between paint coat and substrate. The water glass binding agent is highly resistant to UV light. While dispersions based on acrylate or silicone resin over the years tend to grow brittle, chalky, and crack under UV, the inorganic binder water glass remains stable. The chemical fusion with the substrate and the UV stability of the binder are the fundamental reasons for the extraordinarily high lifetime of silicate paints.

Silicate paints require siliceous substrate for setting. For this reason they are highly suitable for mineral substrates such as mineral plasters and concrete, thus they are of only limited use for application on wood and metal. The permeability to water vapor of silicate paints is equivalent to that of the substrate, so silicate paints do not inhibit the diffusion of water vapor. Moisture contained in parts of a structure or in the plaster may diffuse outward without resistance: this keeps walls dry and prevents structural damage. This addition helps avoid condensation of water on the surface of building materials, reducing the risk of infestation by algae and fungi. The high alkalinity of the water glass binding agent adds to the inhibitory effect against infestation by microorganisms and eliminates the need for additional preservatives.

As mineral paint coats are not prone to static charging and thermo-plasticity (stickiness developing under heat), which is common for surfaces coated with dispersion or silicone resin, soiling happens less, so fewer dirt particles cling to the surface and are easier to wash off. Silicate paints are incombustible and free of organic additives or solvents (DIN 18363 Painting and coating work Section 2.4.1).

Silicate paints are highly color-tone stable. As they are solely colored with mineral pigments that do not fade with exposure to UV radiation, the silicate paint coats remain constant in color for decades.

Silicate paints are based upon mineral raw materials. They are environmentally compatible in manufacture and effect. Their high durability helps to preserve resources, and their contaminant-free composition preserves health and environment. For this reason, silicate paints have gained popularity, especially in sustainable construction.

== Types ==
Commonly three types of silicate paints are distinguished: Pure silicate paint consisting of two components, a color powder in dry or water-paste form and the liquid binder water glass. (DIN 18363 Painting and coating work Section 2.4.1). The processing of pure silicate paints require great experience and know-how but is now of historic interest.

Around the middle of the 20th century the first single-component silicate paint was developed. The addition of up to five mass percent of organic additives (e.g. acrylate dispersion, hydrophobisers, thickeners or similar) makes ready-to-use paint in containers possible. These are also called "dispersion silicate paints" (DIN 18363 Painting and coating work Section 2.4.1). The range of application for such silicate paints is significantly higher than for pure silicate paints as the dispersion allows coats for less solid substrates and/or organic composition. Above that handling and processing is simpler than pure silicate paint.

A third category of silicate paints was introduced in 2002: sol-silicate paint. The binder is a combination of silica sol and water glass. The organic fraction is limited to 5 mass percent similar to dispersion silicate paint allowing for chemical setting and retaining of the silicate specific advantages. The sol silicate paint allows use on non-mineral plaster. For these the bonding occurs chemically and physically. The sol-silicate paint has revolutionized the field of application of silicate paints. These paints can be applied easily and safely to nearly all common substrates.

== Possible substrates ==
- concrete
- earthen plaster
- lime plaster
- masonry
- stone

== Applications ==
- environmentally friendly, non-toxic applications
- high durability, especially on masonry products, and lightfast
- mineral paints with high vapor permeability
- acid rain resistance
- antifungal properties
- reduces carbonation of cement-based materials

== See also ==
- Lime paint
