= Kathleen Anderson =

Kathleen Anderson may refer to:

- Kath Anderson (1921–1996), Australian politician
- Kay Anderson (1902–1974), British artist
- Kathleen Fleur Anderson (born 1971), British politician

== See also ==
- Katherine Anderson (disambiguation)
