= Listwanite =

Metamorphic rock

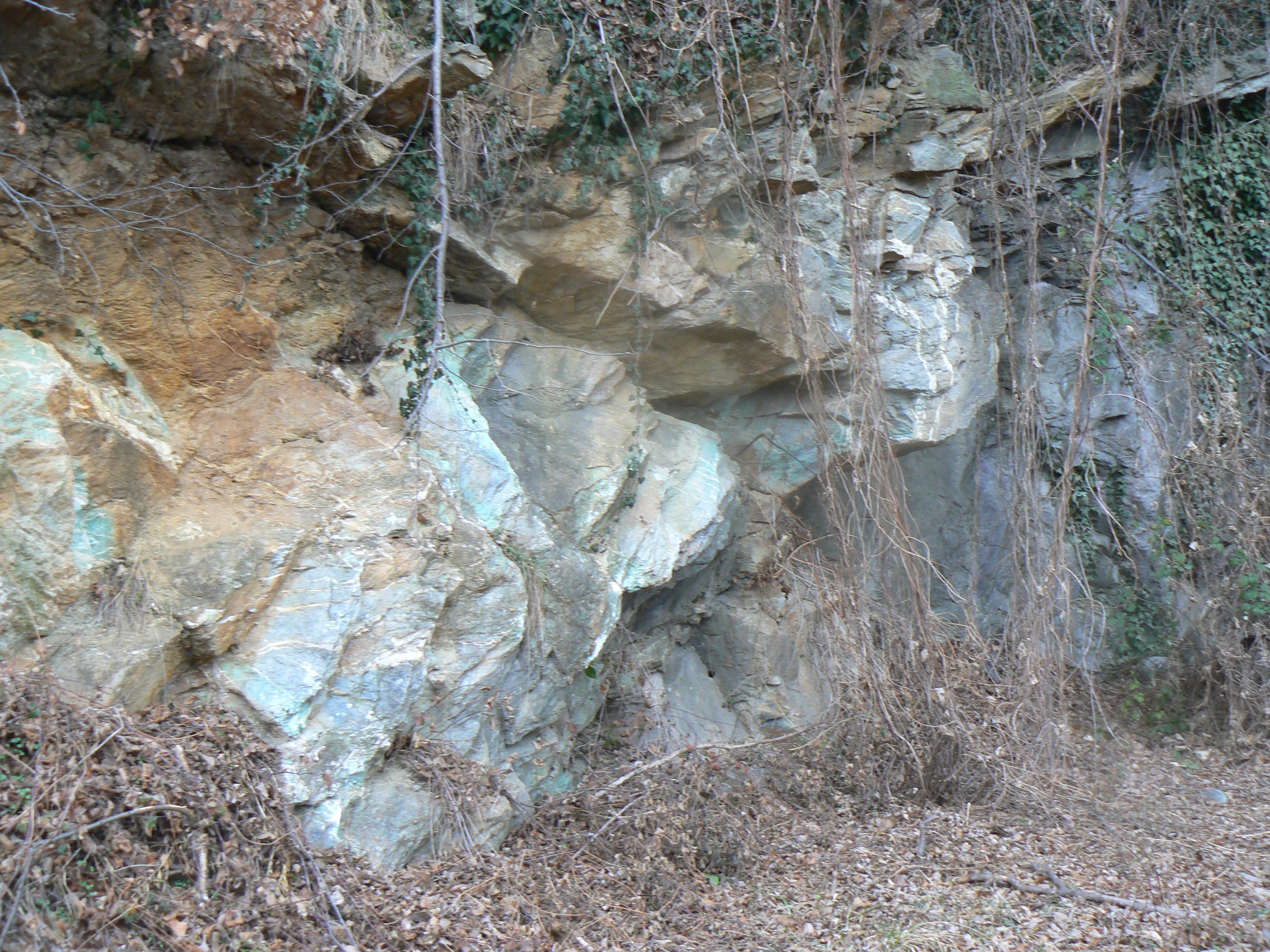
A quarry of listwanite in the region of Aosta Valley, in Italy

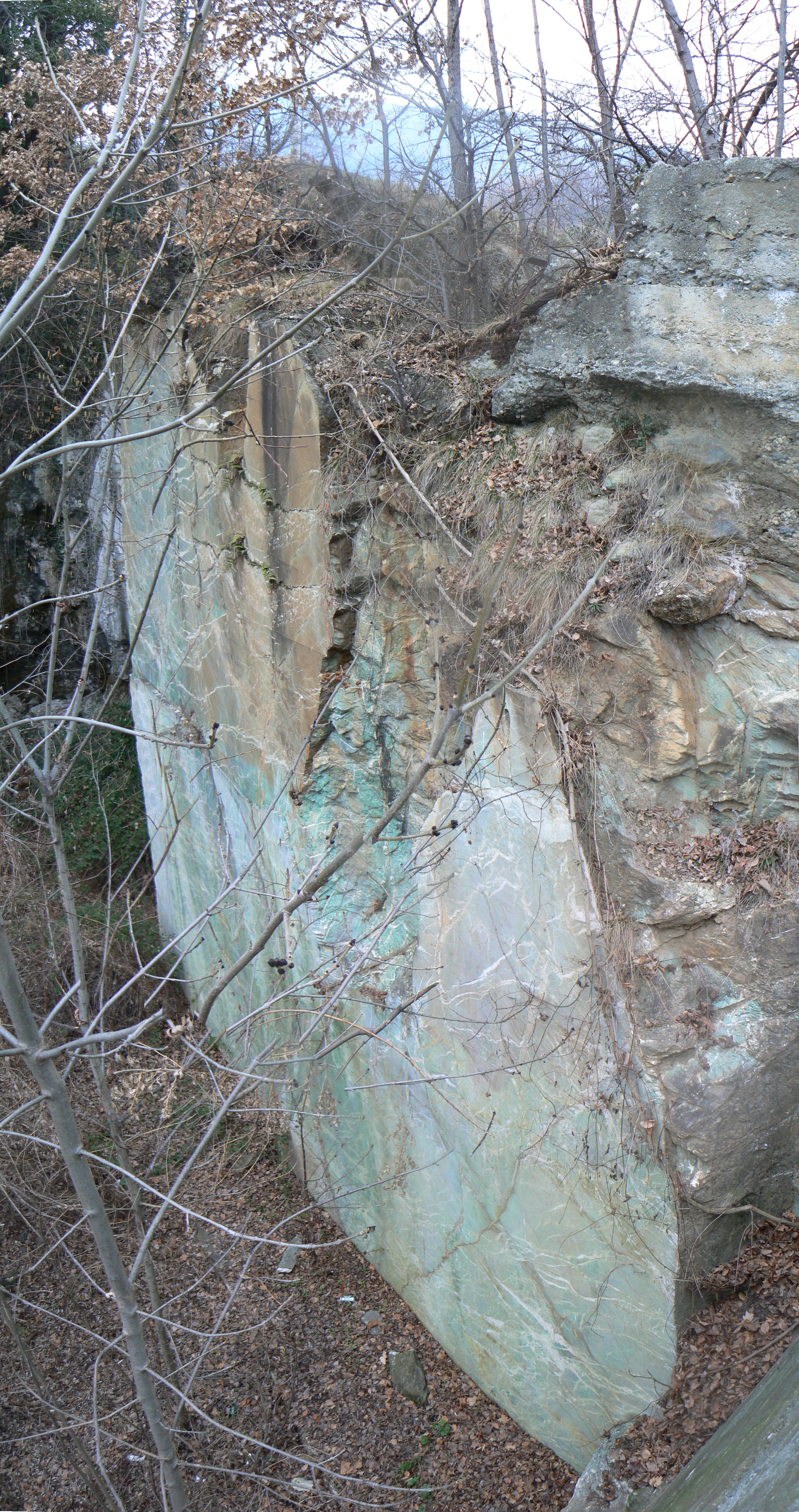
A quarry of listwanite in the region of Aosta Valley, in Italy

Listwanite (also sometimes spelled listvenite, listvanite, or listwaenite) is a rock type that forms when the groundmass of ultramafic rocks, most commonly mantle peridotites, is partially altered to carbonate minerals and cut by ubiquitous carbonate veins containing one or more of magnesite, calcite, dolomite, ankerite, and/or siderite. Original pyroxene and olivine in the peridotite are commonly altered to Mg- or Ca-carbonate and hydrous Mg-silicates, such as serpentine and talc. Complete carbonation of peridotite means that every single atom of magnesium and calcium as well as some of the iron atoms have combined with CO_{2} to form secondary carbonate minerals such a magnesite, calcite, and siderite, while the remaining silica atoms, formerly found in pyroxene and olivine (prior to alteration), are found in quartz, serpentine, and talc. Thus, in terms of bulk mineralogy, listwanites consist primarily of quartz (often of a rusty red colour), carbonate, serpentine, talc, ± mariposite/fuchsite (i.e., Cr-bearing muscovite) ± gold.

== Formation ==
Geologists are still studying how listwanites form, but they likely form through the reaction of CO_{2}-rich fluids with peridotites at approximately 50 to 200 °C. Faults and fractures permit the percolation of the CO_{2}-rich fluids through peridotite, so the formation of listwanites is generally considered to be structurally controlled.

== CO_{2} content ==
Listwanites are important rocks to study for a number of reasons. First of all, listwanites contain large amounts of CO_{2} which originated from fluids that is now stored in solid mineral form. Recently, geologists and other scientists have been investigating the potential of storing CO_{2} in solid minerals (which are more stable than CO_{2} stored as a liquid or gas) through carbonation of mafic and ultramafic rocks. Mafic and ultramafic rocks take up significant CO_{2} through their natural alteration processes. However, the natural carbonation rates of these rocks are too slow to significantly offset anthropogenic CO_{2} emissions. Therefore, scientists are currently investigating if it is possible to geoengineer CO_{2} uptake in mafic and ultramafic rocks so that this CO_{2} uptake happens more quickly. This could be done, perhaps, by fracturing and heating and injection of CO_{2}-rich fluids. This is already being tested in mafic basalts through the CarbFix Project in Iceland and ultramafic peridotite through 44.01 Project in the Semail Ophiolite of Oman.

In addition to the recent interest in listwanites for carbon sequestration efforts, listwanites are also important because they are often associated with economic mineral deposits, particularly gold deposits.

== See also ==
- Metasomatism
