= Verdite =

Verdite is a trade name for two green stones found in Africa

- A variety of serpentinite
- A variety of fuchsite
