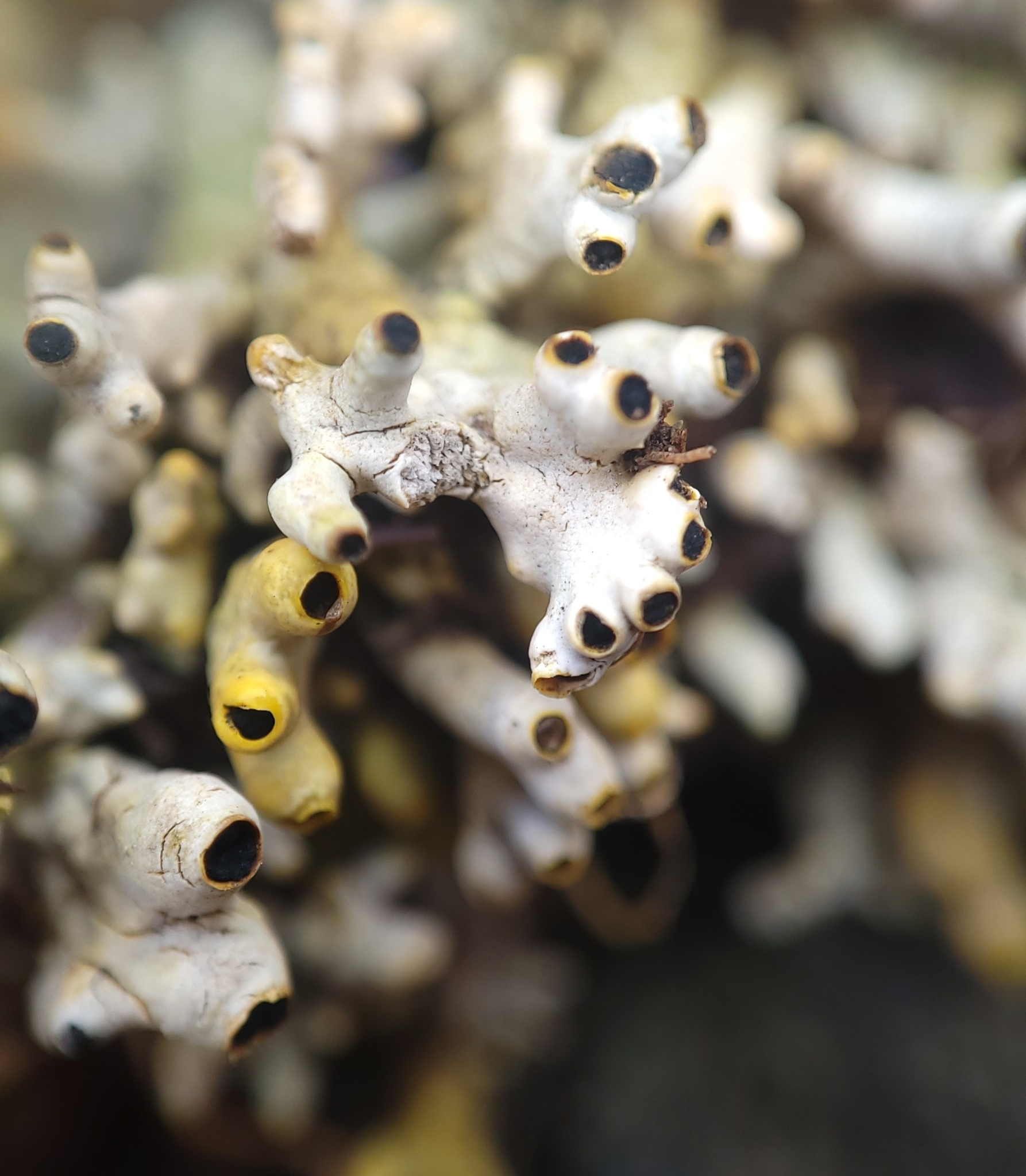

Conservation status
- Vulnerable (NatureServe)

Scientific classification
- Kingdom: Fungi
- Division: Ascomycota
- Class: Lecanoromycetes
- Order: Caliciales
- Family: Caliciaceae
- Genus: Acroscyphus; Lév. (1846)
- Species: A. sphaerophoroides

Binomial name
- Acroscyphus sphaerophoroides Lév. (1846)

= Acroscyphus =

Single-species lichen genus

Acroscyphus is a fungal genus in the family Caliciaceae. This is a monospecific genus, containing the single fruticose lichen species Acroscyphus sphaerophoroides. It is found in various locations in the cordilleras of western North America, including Mexico and British Columbia, as well as high-elevation, exposed regions of Asia (China, Japan), South Africa, Peru, and Patagonia. Commonly known as crab's eye lichen, it forms distinctive cushion-like growths with finger-shaped branches and has a yellow to orange interior. The species typically grows on exposed rocks or dead wood in harsh, windswept environments.

== Taxonomy ==
Both the genus Acroscyphus and its single species A. sphaerophoroides were described by Joseph-Henri Léveillé in 1846 using material in the Paris herbarium that he listed as of unknown origin; two years later, Camille Montagne and Miles Berkeley, who had examined the same specimens, reported that the type derived from the Jean-Baptiste Bory de Saint-Vincent collection and grew on sun-scorched wood from Peru. Early nineteenth-century collections associated with Alexander von Humboldt and Aimé Bonpland were later noted in Paris, but more modern authors have been unable to verify the supposed Mexican material, leaving that historical record uncertain.

Within the order Caliciales, Acroscyphus is distinguished from related genera by a combination of features: a dactyliform (finger-like), cushion-forming thallus; ascocarps (fruiting bodies) immersed on podetia (stalk-like outgrowths); and a yellow to orange medulla (inner tissue). The ascospores are smooth rather than ornamented (unusual in this group) and the photobiont is Trebouxia. Superficially similar taxa can be separated on consistent characters: Tholurna dissimilis has ornamented spores and lacks the coloured medulla and associated chemistry, while Thelomma species have unbranched podetia and differ in ecology. Acroscyphus also shows a distinctive secondary chemistry that supports its treatment as a separate genus within Caliciaceae.

== Chemistry ==
Studies from material collected in the Hengduan Mountains of China indicate that gyrophoric acid is a constant major component of the thallus, alongside skyrin, graciliformin and rugulosin. Two chemical races were recognised in the apothecial tissue that correlate with substrate: one, occurring mostly on rock, contains an additional unknown compound (reported as "UNK3", with trace lecanoric acid); the other, more typical of stumps, has norstictic acid in place of that unknown. These races are sympatric and not supported by morphological differences. A later study of material from Laojunshan (Lijiang, Yunnan) isolated nine metabolites from the thallus: gyrophoric acid and skyrin as the main components, together with methyl lecanorate, lecanoric acid, orcinol, methyl orsellinate, the polyol compounds meso-erythritol and volemitol, and palmitic acid. Four of these (methyl lecanorate, lecanoric acid, orcinol, methyl orsellinate) were reported from this species for the first time.

== Habitat and distribution ==
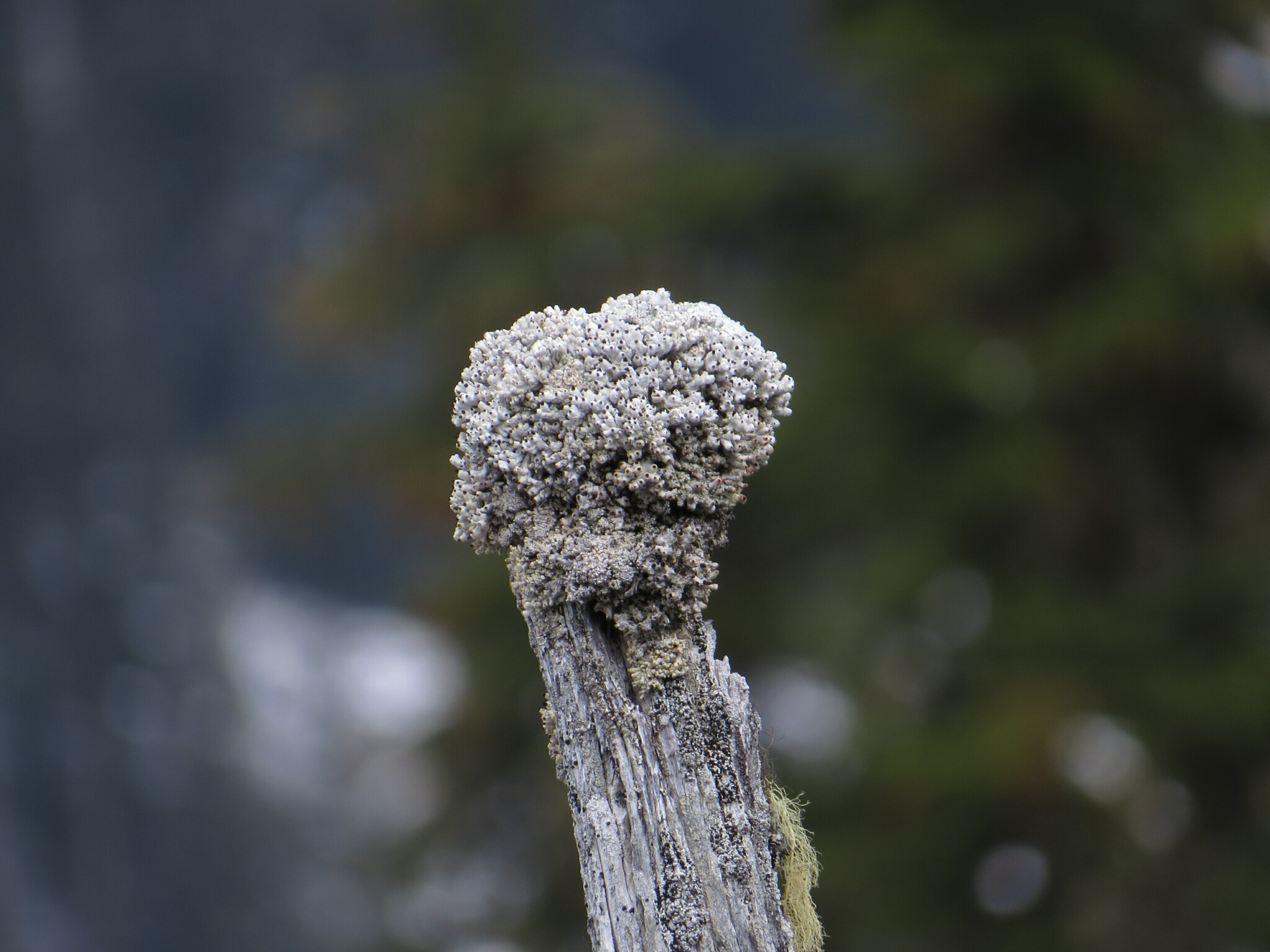
Crab’s eye lichen forming a dense cushion on standing dead wood

Acroscyphus sphaerophoroides has a cool-temperate, high-elevation bias, with scattered records across western North and South America, southern and eastern Asia (including the Himalayas in southern China), and South Africa; similar habitats on tropical mountains (e.g. the Andean cordillera) are also cited. In China, collections are concentrated in the Hengduan Mountains (western Sichuan, north-western Yunnan—Lijiang, Zhongdian, Deqin—and eastern Tibet) at about 3,800–4,500 m, where it appears widespread but generally scarce. Verified African records are from the Western Cape of South Africa (summits in the Riviersonderend Mountains: Jonaskop near Villiersdorp and Galgeberg near Greyton), on exposed sandstone outcrops at roughly 1,410–1,640 m elevation. In North America, fieldwork documents alpine ridges on north Admiralty Island in south-east Alaska (c. 58° N), extending the previous northern limit from about 54° N in British Columbia; earlier accounts also list British Columbia and Washington State, and mention an unverified historical report from Veracruz, Mexico, with high mountains near Perote suggested as possible refugia.

Reported substrates vary geographically. Earlier literature summarised the species mainly on rock and only occasionally on wood, but North American material was more often on wood; one Washington collection was gathered as ground litter and appears to have fallen from a branch. Elevationally, sites in British Columbia and Washington were at or below about 1,300 m (4,300 ft), whereas localities nearer the equator are around 4,000 m (13,000 ft) and above. In Alaska, thalli occurred on or near the tops of exposed rock outcrops in open alpine terrain, over carbonate with quartz veins (mariposite present) and a magnesium-rich greenstone. In the Hengduanshan Mountains the species grows on both rock and dead wood, commonly Juniperus stumps.

Ecologically, the species is chiefly montane to alpine, unlike superficially similar lowland/coastal Thelomma; its disjunct, peak-to-peak distribution has been interpreted either as the outcome of high-altitude spore movement over intervening warm lowlands or, alternatively, as a pattern limited by relatively large, passively dispersed spores that may constrain long-distance dispersal. Coastal hyper-maritime and subalpine belts in British Columbia and northern Washington may form a corridor of suitable habitat, though populations appear sparse and localised.
