= Ray Walker (artist) =

English artist

Ray Walker (1945–1984) was an English artist, considered among the most prominent of a movement of political and community orientated artists who created murals in London during the 1970s and 1980s.

Walker was born in Toxteth, Liverpool, UK. After completing study at Liverpool School of Art (Liverpool College of Art) and the Royal College of Art in London, Walker became a prolific and outstanding painter of public murals in London through the 1970s until his untimely death in 1984. A large memorial retrospective exhibition of the artist's paintings was held at the Royal Festival Hall, London in 1985. The Hackney Peace Mural was designed by Ray Walker but the painting (in Keimfarben silicate paint) was executed in 1985 by his colleague and friend, Mick Jones, and Ray's wife, Anna Walker, following his death. The mural is dedicated to the memory of the artist and also features a portrait of the artist.

== Publications ==
- Ray Walker - published by the Ray Walker Memorial Committee for an exhibition at the Royal Festival Hall, 17 May-16 June, 1985
- Ray Walker - Murals Paintings and Drawings
- Ray Walker - Murals Paintings and Drawings
- For Walls With Tongues, An Oral History of Street Murals 1966-1985 ed. Carol Kenna & Steve Lobb pub. Greenwich Mural Workshop
