= June Furlong =

Artist's model and art exhibition organiser (1930–2020)

- Born: 3 June 1930; Liverpool, England
- Died: 20 November 2020 (aged 90)
- Known for: Modeling

June Furlong (3 June 1930 – 20 November 2020) was a life model at the Liverpool College of Art for 48 years. She also modelled at the Slade School of Fine Art and the Royal College of Art and organised art exhibitions.

== Personal life ==
Furlong was born in Liverpool on 3 June 1930. She was with her parents at their home in Falkner Street during the Second World War when an incendiary bomb landed on in the house, with the fire fortunately extinguished by the parents.

Furlong died on 20 November 2020, at the age of 90.

== Modelling career ==
Furlong started modelling in 1947 when she was 17 and continued until she was 65. Most of her career was at the Liverpool School of Art, but in the 1950s she was in London for 5 years, modelling at the Slade School of Fine Art, Goldsmiths College and the Royal College of Art. As a consequence she is the subject of artwork by artists such as Lucian Freud, Frank Auerbach, Stanley Reed, Mike Hatjoullis, Josh Kirby, George W. Jardine, John Lennon, and indeed almost all those who were art students in Liverpool between the 1960s and early 1990s.

== Exhibitions ==
She organised an exhibition of the work of Josh Kirby at the Albert Dock, Liverpool, in 1988 and was co-organiser of an exhibition of work by George W. Jardine in 2012 at the Liverpool Academy of Art.

An exhibition of portraits of Furlong was held to celebrate her 90th birthday in June 2020 at the Williamson Art Gallery and Museum, Birkenhead.
