= Stanley Reed =

Stanley Reed may refer to:

- Stanley Forman Reed (1884–1980), American Supreme Court Justice
- Stanley Reed (artist) (1908–1978), British artist
- Sir Stanley Reed (British politician) (1872–1969), British Conservative politician and journalist in India
- Stanley Foster Reed (1917–2007), publisher who founded Reed Research Inc.
- Stanley John Reed (1943–2006), South African yachtsman, see Bertie Reed
- Stanley Reid, Australian cricketer
