= Johann Nepomuk von Fuchs =

German chemist and mineralogist (1774–1856)

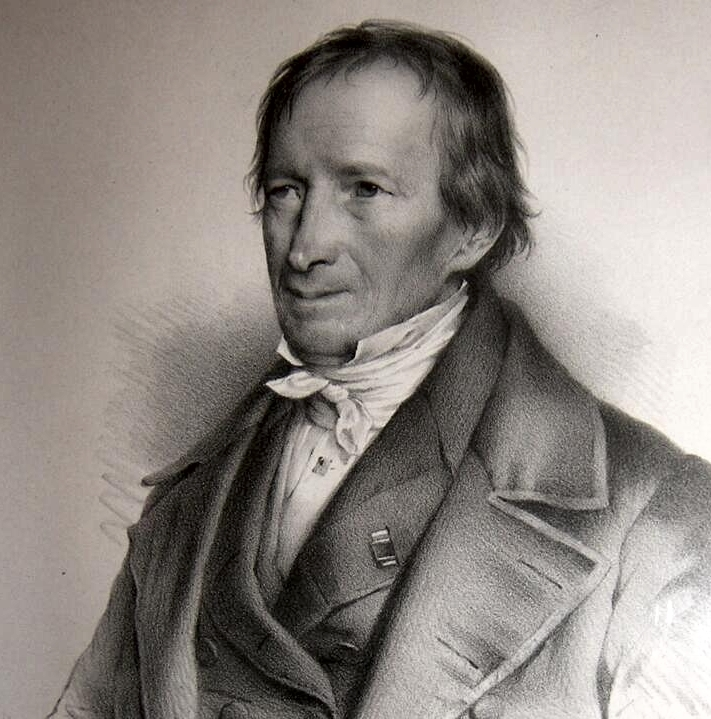
- Drawing of Fuchs, 1856
- Born: 15 May 1774; Mattenzell, Germany
- Died: 5 March 1856 (aged 81); Munich
- Monuments: Fuchsite
- Education: Ludwig-Maximilians-Universität (LMU)
- Occupations: Chemist, mineralogogist
- Years active: 1821-1852
- Known for: Inventing mineral painting

Johann Nepomuk von Fuchs (15 May 1774 – 5 March 1856) was a German chemist and mineralogist, and royal Bavarian privy councillor.

== Biography ==
He was born at Mattenzell, near Falkenstein in the Bavarian Forest. In 1807, he became professor of chemistry and mineralogy at the Ludwig-Maximilians-Universität (LMU), which was located in Landshut at the time, and in 1823 conservator of the mineralogical collections at Munich, where he was appointed professor of mineralogy three years later, when the university was relocated. He retired in 1852, was ennobled by the Maximilian II of Bavaria in 1854, and died in Munich on 5 March 1856.

He is largely known for his mineralogical observations and for his work on waterglass (sodium silicate). He used it to develop stereochromy, a kind of fresco painting where the pigments are fixed with waterglass. Historically, the substance was sometimes referred to as "Fuchs's soluble glass". Also, he developed a scientific method for the production of cement and made contributions to the understanding of the amorphic state of solids.

He coined the mineral names wagnerite (1821) and margarite (1823), and with Adolph Ferdinand Gehlen, was co-describer of the mineral mesolite (1816). A variety of muscovite called fuchsite commemorates his name.

== Published works ==
- Über die Entstehung der Porzellan-Erde, 1821 [On the origin of porcelain earth]
- Neue Methode das Bier auf seine wesentlichen Bestandtheile zu untersuchen, 1836 [New method to research essential components of beer]
- Naturgeschichte des Mineralreichs, 1842 [Natural history of the mineral world]
- Über die Theorien der Erde, den Amorphismus fester Körper und den gegenseitigen Einfluß der Chemie und Mineralogie, 1844 [On theories in earth sciences, the amorphism of solid bodies and the mutual influence of chemistry and mineralogy]
- La stéréochromie: peinture monumentale, 1861 (French translation by Léon Dalemagne)
