= Rathmell (surname) =

Rathmell is a surname. Notable people with the surname include:

- Kimryn Rathmell (born 1969), American physician-scientist
- Lilian Rathmell (1909–2000), British artist
- Malcolm Rathmell (born 1949), British motorcycle trials rider
