= Roy Holt =

English painter

Roy Holt (1942–2007) was a British contemporary artist specialising in painting.

Born in Surrey and studied at the Royal Academy Schools and later at Goldsmiths College. His work has been exhibited widely in museums and galleries in the UK, Europe, the US and China; has been shown twice at the John Moores biennial and three times at the Young Contemporaries (now called New Contemporaries).

As well as working in his London studio he was also a Principal Lecturer and Reader in Contemporary Fine Art Practice at Liverpool College of Art where he taught for four decades. He was a visiting lecturer at the Royal Academy Schools, the Royal College and on the Fine Art MA at Goldsmiths School of Art.

Holt's formal specialism was colour and he was a passionate disciple of Josef Albers. His broader interest which informed his artwork and teaching, was based on the notion of 'Art as Folly'. His art works are mainly wall–based installations often reflecting DIY culture which he saw as a rich source reflecting some of the latent desires and hopes in society.

He considered art objects as 'Objects of Speculation' in which he saw the role of the viewer as pivotal, challenging our rationalism (and insecurities) thus allowing us to speculate on a more wonderful universe.

In addition to his art practice he also wrote many critical texts, including 'Verbs Posing as Nouns' in 'Sigmar Polke: Back to Postmodernity' published by Tate Liverpool and Liverpool University Press.

He was also an original member of the Liverpool Art School band Deaf School in the mid 1970s, playing his much loved instrument, the banjo.

== See also ==
- British art
