= Maurice Cockrill =

British painter and poet

Professor Maurice Cockrill, RA, FBA (8 October 1935 – 1 December 2013) was a British painter and poet.

Born in Hartlepool, County Durham, he studied at Wrexham School of Art, North East Wales, then Denbigh Technical College and later the University of Reading from 1960–64. In Liverpool, where he lived for nearly twenty years from 1964, he taught at Liverpool College of Art and Liverpool Polytechnic and Nottingham University. At the latter he was closely associated with David Taborn who had a pivotal role in developing Cockrill's works. He was a central figure in Liverpool's artistic life, regularly exhibiting at the Walker Art Gallery, before his departure for London in 1982. Cockrill's Liverpool work was in line with that of John Baum, Sam Walsh and Adrian Henri, employing Pop and Photo-Realist styles, but later he moved towards Romantic Expressionism, as it was shown in his retrospective at the Walker Art Gallery, Liverpool in 1995. His poetry was published in magazines such as "Ambit" and "Poetry Review".

He was formerly the Keeper of the Royal Academy, and as such managed the RA Schools of the Establishment as well as being a member of the board and executive committee.

Cockrill received the John Moores Liverpool Exhibition, in addition to awards from the Arts Council of Great Britain, Flags and other Projects, Royal Festival Hall, the Arts Council of Great Britain (Major Award), and the Arts Council Works of Art in Public Spaces. He was also given a British Council Award in 1985.

== Exhibitions ==
- 1984 Edward Totah Gallery, London
- 1985 Bernard Jacobson Gallery, London and New York
- 1985 Kunstmuseum, Düsseldorf
- 1990 Forces of Nature, Manchester City Art Gallery (travelling exhibition)
- 1991 Cabinet Paintings, Gillian Jason Gallery London (travelling exhibition)
- 1992 Plymouth Art Centre Plymouth, England
- 1993 Paintings, Galerie Bugdahn und Kaimer Düsseldorf
- 1994 Jerwood exhibitions, Royal Scottish Academy & Edinburgh & Royal Academy London
- 1995 Annandale Gallery Sydney, Australia
- 1995 Paintings and Drawings 1974–1994, Walker Art Gallery, Liverpool/Djanogly Art Gallery The University of Nottinghams Arts Centre, England
- 1995 Malerei. Sechs Bilder - Sechs Positionen, Galerie Bugdahn und Kaimer Düsseldorf
- 1997 Tamworth City Art Gallery New South Wales, Australia
- 1998 DG Bank/German British Forum London
- 1998 The Elements, Galerie Bugdahn und Kaimer Düsseldorf
- 1998 Recent Paintings, Royal West of England Academy Bristol, England
- 1998 The Enduring Tradition - Drawings, Queensland Australia (travelling exhibition)
- 1999 Zwischenraum #1. Malerei, Galerie Bugdahn und Kaimer Düsseldorf

== See also ==
- Royal Academy
