= Edith Edmonds =

English artist (1874-1951)

- Born: Edith Lilian Barnish; 1874; Wigan, England
- Died: 1951 (aged 76–77)
- Education: Liverpool School of Art; Atelier Delbos
- Known for: Painting

Edith Lilian Edmonds, née Barnish, (1874-1951) was an English artist who, working in oils and watercolours, was known for her still-life and landscape paintings.

== Biography ==
Born in Wigan, Edmonds studied at the Liverpool School of Art during 1921 and 1922 and then at the Atelier Delbos in Paris throughout 1923 and 1924. In Britain she was a frequent exhibitor at the Royal Academy, with the Society of Women Artists, the Royal Cambrian Academy and the Royal Society of British Artists. Her work was also shown at the Paris Salon in 1938. For many years Edmonds lived in Conway in north Wales.
