= Helen Clapcott =

English painter

- Born: 1952 (age 73–74); Blackpool, England
- Education: Liverpool School of Art; Royal Academy Schools
- Known for: Landscape painting
- Awards: David Murray Landscape Award

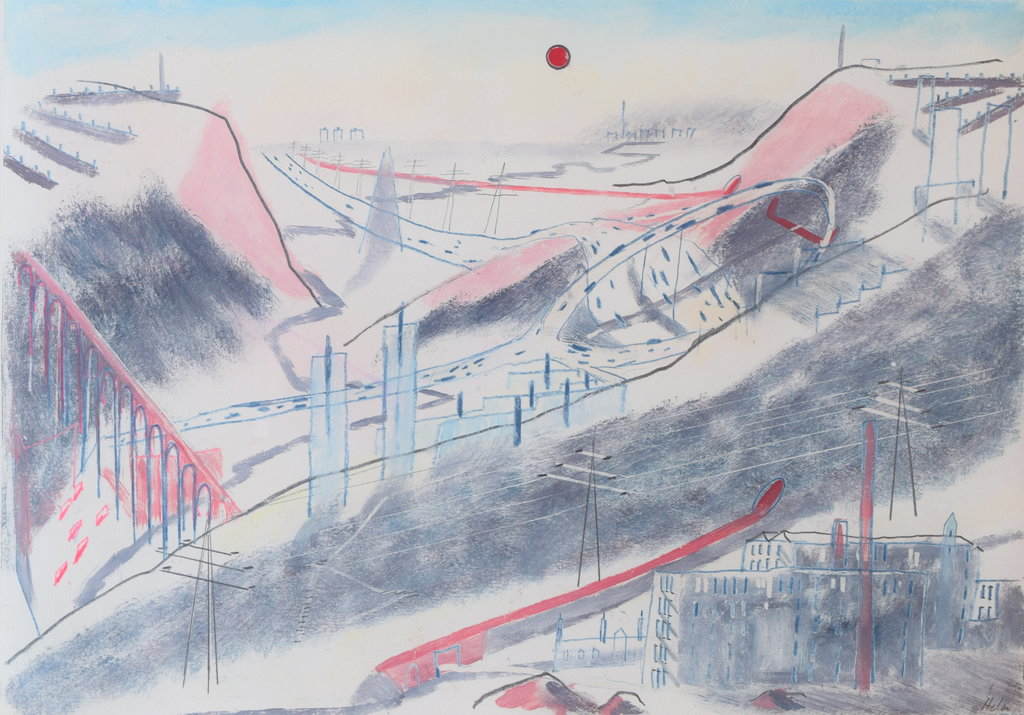
Roundabout

Helen Clapcott (born 1952) is an English painter.

== Life ==
Helen Clapcott was born in Blackpool in 1952, moving to Stockport with her family when she was ten. She now lives in Macclesfield with her husband, the illustrator, Ian Pollock Her work concentrates on the Stockport valley, the mills, and the effects that humankind has on the landscape.

Clapcott studied Fine Art at the Liverpool School of Art between 1971 and 1975. She won a David Murray Landscape Award which allowed her to paint in Morocco. She undertook postgraduate studies at the Royal Academy Schools during 1978 and 1979, where she attended alongside her friend and fellow artist Mary Mabbutt. At the Academy Schools she won the David Murray Prize three times and the academy purchased her painting Life School in the Royal Academy for its collection. After graduating from the academy she won the Elizabeth Greenshields Foundation scholarship.

=== Exhibitions ===
Clapcott has had exhibitions at Osborne Samuels, Messums and Gallery Oldham. In 1984 Clapcott had a series of solo exhibitions at Salford City Art Gallery, the Stockport War Memorial Gallery and at the Ginnel Gallery in Manchester. She also had a solo show in 2003 at Scolar Fine Art.
