= Katie Anderson =

Katie Anderson may refer to:

== People ==
- Keturah Anderson (born 1968), Canadian-Jamaican hurdler and four-time Olympian
- Katie Anderson, a child actress portraying Poppy Kettle in the British children's television series Tracy Beaker Returns

== Fictional characters ==
- Katie Anderson, a fictional character in Nemesis: Reloaded
- Katy Anderson, a fictional character in Andy Hardy's Blonde Trouble

== See also ==
- Kate Anderson (disambiguation)
- Katherine Anderson (disambiguation)
