= Margaret Blundell =

British artist (1907–1996)

Margaret Leah Blundell
- Born: 1907; Wallasey, England
- Died: 1996 (aged 88–89); Bangor, Wales
- Education: Cheltenham Ladies' College; Cheltenham School of Art; Liverpool School of Art
- Known for: Painting, murals

Margaret Leah Blundell (1907–1996) was a British artist, notable as a mural painter, commercial artist and printmaker.

== Biography ==
Blundell was born in 1907 at Wallasey, Cheshire (now Merseyside), and attended Cheltenham Ladies' College before going on to study at the Cheltenham School of Art and then, from 1925, at the Liverpool School of Art.

Subsequently, Blundell produced illustrations for magazines and catalogues and also created murals for shops and hotels. Her mural commissions included one for the cafeteria at Lewis's store in Manchester, for the Pleasure Beach Company at Blackpool, for the Daniel Neal chain of shops, for Heal's department store, for the liner RMS Caronia and for LMS hotels. Her murals were featured in the Architects' Journal and Building News. Illustrations by Blundell were featured in the Radio Times and in catalogues for WHSmith and for both Barkers and Lewis's department stores.

Throughout her painting career, Blundell exhibited with the Royal Society of British Artists, the Society of Wood Engravers, the Royal Cambrian Academy and at the Walker Art Gallery in Liverpool. She became an associate member of the Royal Cambrian Academy in 1951, and a full member in 1956.

Blundell lived at Rhydwyn on Anglesey in north Wales for several years and died at nearby Bangor.
