= Ruth Duckworth =

American sculptor

- Born: April 10, 1919; Hamburg, Germany
- Died: October 18, 2009 (aged 90); Chicago, Illinois
- Known for: sculptor

Artwork by Ruth Duckworth

Untitled porcelain sculpture by Ruth Duckworth, 1998, Metropolitan Museum of Art

Ruth Duckworth (April 10, 1919 – October 18, 2009) was a modernist sculptor who specialized in ceramics, she worked in stoneware, porcelain, and bronze. Her sculptures are mostly untitled. She is best known for Clouds over Lake Michigan, a wall sculpture.

== Early life and education ==
Born Ruth Windmüller on April 10, 1919, in Hamburg, Germany, Ruth Duckworth took up drawing after a doctor recommended that she remain homebound to improve her health. She was the youngest of five children. Her oldest brother promised to watch over her for the rest of her life, but was later killed when his ship was sunk by a Japanese submarine.

The daughter of Ellen Strack, a Lutheran, and Edgar Albert Windmüller, a Jewish lawyer, she left Germany to study at the Liverpool College of Art in 1936, as she could not study art in her home country under the restrictions imposed by Nazi Germany. She later studied at the Hammersmith School of Art and at the City and Guilds of London Art School, where she learned stone carving. Using these skills, she launched her sculptural career and began specializing in tombstone carvings. When she applied for art school, she was asked if she wanted to focus on drawing, painting, or sculpting. She insisted that she wanted to study all of them; after all, she replied, Michelangelo had done so.

- 1919: Born Hamburg, Germany
- 1936–1940: Liverpool School of Art England
- 1955: Hammersmith School of Art
- 1956–1958: Central School of Arts and Crafts London, England
- 1982: Honorary Doctorate, DePaul University Chicago, IL
- 2007: Honorary Doctorate Degree, College for Creative Studies, Detroit, Michigan, USA

She married the British artist Aidron Duckworth in 1949 and they later moved to the United States in 1964, where Ruth taught at the University of Chicago's Midway Studios and Aidron was a visiting professor of sculpture at the University of Illinois. The couple divorced in 1967.

== Ceramist ==
Untitled (Mama Pot) (2007) at the Renwick Gallery in Washington, DC, in 2022

Inspired by an art exhibit of works from India, Duckworth studied ceramic art at the Central School of Arts and Crafts starting in 1956. While her early ceramic work was in traditional forms, she soon started to produce more abstract works. Her work started to fall into a middle ground that wasn't the typical ceramics thrown on a wheel and fired in a kiln or the standard forms of sculpture that used metal, stone or wood. As described by ceramist Tony Franks, Duckworth's style of "Organic clay had arrived like a harvest festival, and would remain firmly in place well into the '70s". While ceramists such as Bernard Leach rejected her work, other artists in the UK started adopting her style of hand worked clay objects.

She characterized porcelain ceramic as "a very temperamental material. I'm constantly fighting it. It wants to lie down, you want it to stand up. I have to make it do what it doesn't want to do. But there's no other material that so effectively communicates both fragility and strength."

In 1964 Duckworth accepted a teaching post at the University of Chicago's Midway Studios. She remained there through the next decade, eventually deciding to settle permanently in the United States, her third homeland. Her mural series Earth, Water and Sky (1967–68) was commissioned by the university for its Geophysical Sciences Building and included topographical designs based on satellite photographs with porcelain clouds overhead. Her 240-square-foot mural Clouds Over Lake Michigan (1976) is a figurative depiction of the Lake Michigan watershed. It was formerly on display at the Chicago Board Options Exchange Building., and is now on display at Regenstein Library at the University of Chicago.

While at the University of Chicago, Duckworth had a studio in the Pilsen neighborhood in the Lower West Side of Chicago.

She remained in Chicago after retiring from the university in 1977 and moved to a space in the Lakeview neighborhood on the city's North Side, in a former pickle plant. She had a hole in the floor of her second-floor living quarters, which allowed her to view works in progress in her studio and to envision how they would look on a wall. There she created the concepts for large bronze works for Eastern Illinois University, Lewis and Clark Community College and Northeastern Illinois University.

A retrospective of her work Ruth Duckworth: Modernist Sculptor opened in 2005 at New York City's Museum of Arts & Design before traveling to other museums across the country. In 2006, her works were featured at the Art Expo at the Seventh Regiment Armory in Manhattan. Her work is also represented internationally, including at the Victoria & Albert Museum in London.

There is a documentary about the late sculptor titled Ruth Duckworth: A Life in Clay. Ruth Duckworth's artistic synthesis-combining aesthetic influences from many times and places with her unique contemporary vision-is most masterfully executed in her figural studies grounded in Cycladic formalism.

Her work, Untitled (Mama Pot), was acquired by the Smithsonian American Art Museum as part of the Renwick Gallery's 50th Anniversary Campaign.

== Death ==
Duckworth died in Chicago at age 90 on October 19, 2009, at the Seasons Hospice & Palliative Care after a brief illness.
