= Katherine Anderson (disambiguation) =

Katherine Anderson (1944–2023) was an American singer.

Katherine Anderson (or variants) may also refer to:

- Katherine Anderson, character in The Forbidden Dance
- Catherine Anderson (born 1948), writer of historical and contemporary romance novels
- Catherine Anderson (scientist), Canadian medical scientist
- Catherine Corley Anderson (1909–2001), writer of children's books
- Joyce Symons (1918–2004), née Catherine Joyce Anderson, Hong Kong educator
- Kathryn Anderson (born 1939), British-American pediatric surgeon
- Kathryn Virginia Anderson (1952–2020), American developmental biologist
- Kathryn Forbes (born Kathryn Anderson, 1908–1966), American writer and memoirist
- Katherine McCall Anderson (1866–1924), British civilian and military matron
- Kitty Anderson (headmistress) (1903–1979), British schoolteacher

== See also ==
- Kath Anderson (Kathleen Anderson, 1921–1996), Australian politician
- Kay Anderson (Kathleen Anderson, 1902–1974), British artist
- Katie Anderson (disambiguation)
- Kate Anderson (disambiguation)
