= May Louise Greville Cooksey =

British painter (1878-1943)

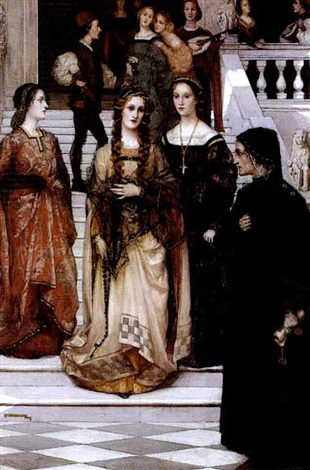
- The Meeting of Beatrice and Dante (1910)
- Born: 10 January 1878; Birmingham, England
- Died: 1943 (aged 64–65)
- Known for: Painting

May Louise Greville Cooksey (10 January 1878 – 1943) was a British painter of ecclesiastical subjects, figures and landscapes in the Pre-Raphaelite style.

== Biography ==
Cooksey was born in Birmingham and studied at both the Leamington School of Art and at Liverpool School of Art. She then went on to study at the South Kensington School of Art in London where she won silver and bronze medals for her work. A travelling scholarship allowed Cooksey to visit Italy. When she returned to London she took a teaching position at the South Kensington School. She exhibited on a regular basis at the Royal Academy and later in life lived at Freshfield in Lancashire. Cooksey was a member of the Liverpool Academy of Arts.
