= Kate Anderson =

Kate Anderson may refer to:

- Kate Anderson (cricketer) (born 1996), New Zealand cricketer
- Kate Anderson-Richardson (born 1973), née Kate Anderson
- Kate Anderson, fictional character in Intelligence

== See also ==
- Katie Anderson (disambiguation)
- Katherine Anderson (disambiguation)
- Kate Andersen (1870–1957), New Zealand teacher, community leader, and writer
- Kate Andersen Brower, American journalist and author
