= John Meirion Morris =

Welsh sculptor (1936–2020)

- Born: 14 March 1936; Llanuwchllyn, Wales
- Died: 18 September 2020 (aged 84)
- Occupation: Sculptor

John Meirion Morris (14 March 1936 – 18 September 2020) was a Welsh sculptor.

Morris was born in Llanuwchllyn, near Bala, Gwynedd, where his parents kept a shop. He studied at Liverpool College of Art and later taught the subject at Llanidloes. In 1966, he began a period as a lecturer at Kumasi University in Ghana, returning to Wales two years later to lecture at Aberystwyth University.

In 1985, he obtained his M.Phil. for research into Celtic La Tène art, and he subsequently returned to his home town to work as a sculptor.

His works included the design and model for the proposed Tryweryn monument and a bronze bust of Ray Gravell at the BBC studios in Cardiff. A retrospective exhibition of his work was hosted by the National Library of Wales in 2009.

One of his sculptures, Pieta, commemorates his son Dylan, who died in 2002 of a brain tumour.

Morris died, aged 84, in 2020, survived by his wife Gwawr and two children.
