= Amorphism =

Substance lacking an ordered form

An amorphism, in chemistry, crystallography and, by extension, to other areas of the natural sciences is a substance or feature that lacks an ordered form. In the specific case of crystallography, an amorphic material is one that lacks long range (significant) crystalline order at the molecular level. In the history of chemistry, amorphism was recognised even before the discovery of the nature of the exact atomic crystalline lattice structure. The concept of amorphism can also be found in the fields of art, biology, archaeology and philosophy as a characterisation of objects without form, or with random or unstructured form.

== Amorphous and Crystalline solid ==
In the context of solids, amorphous and crystalline are terms used to describe the structure of materials. Amorphous solids are the opposite of crystalline. The atoms or molecules in amorphous substances are arranged randomly without any long-range order. As a result, they do not have a sharp melting point. The phase transition from solid to liquid occurs over a range of temperatures. Some examples include glass, rubber and some plastics.

== See also ==
- Glass
- Obsidian

== Bibliography ==
- Gmelin, Leopold (1872). "Handbook of Chemistry". Works of the Cavendish Society. 2 (vol. 1 of Gmelin). London: Cavendish Society: 103. OCLC 47348608.
- Solovyof, Vladimir; Duddington, Natalie; Jakim, Boris (2005). The Justification of the Good: An Essay on Moral Philosophy. Wm. B. Eerdmans Publishing. ISBN 0-8028-2863-9.
- Weiss, Jeffrey S. (1994). The Popular Culture of Modern Art: Picasso, Duchamp, and Avant-gardism. New Haven, Connecticut: Yale University Press. ISBN 0-300-05895-0.
