= Keimfarben =

German paint manufacturer

Keimfarben (company) KEIM MINERAL COATINGS of America, Inc., KEIM MINERAL PAINTS LTD
- Company type: GmbH (German public limited company)
- Industry: construction materials industry
- Founded: Abensberg (1878)
- Founder: Adolf Wilhelm Keim
- Headquarters: Diedorf, Germany
- Key people: Rüdiger Lugert
- Products: Paints
- Number of employees: approx 450 worldwide
- Website: www.keimfarben.de www.keimpaints.co.uk www.keim.com

Keimfarben GmbH (German pronunciation: [ˈkaɪmˌfaʁbn̩]) is a medium-sized company based in Diedorf near Augsburg. It belongs to the Leonhard Moll AG Group and is one of the world's leading manufacturers of silicate paints. Buildings such as the White House, Mariinskyi Palace, Buckingham Palace, Sydney Opera House, and the Bolshoi Theatre are painted with Keimfarben paints.

Company founder Adolf Wilhelm Keim is seen as the inventor of silicate paints (mineral paints), which revolutionised the builders' and painters' trade at the end of the 19th century.

== History ==
The reign of King Ludwig I of Bavaria was a time of intensive research into water glass (potassium silicate). The king loved the colorful lime frescoes in North Italy and longed to enjoy the typically splendid colors produced by lime paints in his own kingdom. But the harsh German climate was not suitable for the technique used in Italy.

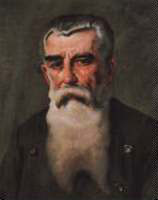
Adolf Wilhelm Keim

Eventually, the skilled craftsman and researcher Adolf Wilhelm Keim succeeded in mixing liquid water glass and mineral color pigments to create a paint that could withstand the climate north of the Alps while at the same time offering brilliant colors. The paint's durability results from the chemical bond formed by the binding agent with the substrate (silification). Keim obtained a patent for his mineral paints in 1878, thus laying the foundation stone for today's company KEIMFARBEN GMBH. The first production site was near to the limestone quarry in Offenstetten (which belongs to Abensberg today) in Lower Bavaria.

== Group structure ==
Headquarters in Diedorf Subsidiary in Alteno

Keimfarben has two German sites in Diedorf (headquarters) and Alteno/Luckau and altogether eleven foreign subsidiaries in Europe (Austria, Switzerland, Italy, France, Spain, the Netherlands, the United Kingdom, Scandinavia, Poland, the Czech Republic) and the United States. Authorised dealers are responsible for sales in countries where Keimfarben does not have its own subsidiary (Australia, Canada, China, Singapore, Malaysia, Indonesia and Russia). On 6 September 2012, KEIMFARBEN GMBH & Co KG changed its legal form and now operates under the name of "KEIMFARBEN GMBH".

== Product range ==
Keim laid the foundation for the success of Keimfarben in 1878 with KEIM Purkristalat, a two-component pure silicate paint. The second generation of Keim paints followed in 1962 with Keim Granital, the first silicate emulsion paint; in contrast to Purkristalat, this is a one-component paint which makes it easier to apply. In 2002, Keimfarben then launched Keim Soldalit, a sol-silicate or colloidal silicate paint (binding agent: colloidal silica and water glass), which makes it much easier to apply silicate paints so that they are suitable for universal use.

Keimfarben produces paint systems for external and internal use, mineral renders and fillers, natural stone repair systems and thermal insulation composite systems, together with concrete repair and surface protection systems. A new item in the product range is silicate paint for wooden substrates.
