= Muscovite =

Phyllosilicate mineral in the dioctahedral mica group

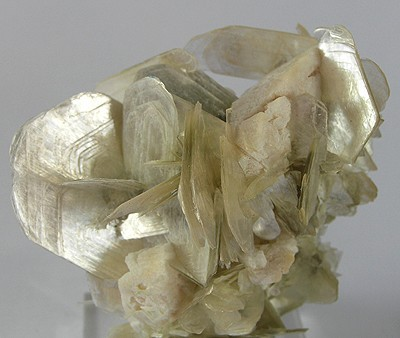
- Muscovite with albite from Doce valley, Minas Gerais, Brazil (dimensions: 6 × 5.3 × 3.9 cm)

General
- Category: Phyllosilicate minerals
- Group: Mica group, dioctahedral mica group
- Formula: KAl_{2}(AlSi_{3}O_{10})(OH,F)_{2}
- IMA symbol: Ms
- Strunz classification: 9.EC.15
- Dana classification: 71.02.02a.01
- Crystal system: Monoclinic
- Crystal class: Prismatic (2/m) (same H-M symbol)
- Space group: C2/c
- Unit cell: a = 5.199 Å, b = 9.027 Å, c = 20.106 Å, β = 95.78°; Z = 4

Identification
- Color: White, grey, silvery
- Crystal habit: Massive to platy
- Twinning: Common on the [310], less common on the {001}
- Cleavage: Perfect on the {001}
- Fracture: Micaceous
- Tenacity: Elastic
- Mohs scale hardness: 2–2.5 parallel to {001} 4 right angle to {001}
- Luster: Vitreous, silky, pearly
- Streak: White
- Diaphaneity: Transparent to translucent
- Specific gravity: 2.76–3
- Optical properties: Biaxial (−)
- Refractive index: n_{α} = 1.552–1.576 n_{β} = 1.582–1.615 n_{γ} = 1.587–1.618
- Birefringence: δ = 0.035 – 0.042
- Pleochroism: Weak when colored
- Dispersion: r > v weak
- Ultraviolet fluorescence: None

Muscovite (also known as common mica, isinglass, or potash mica) is a hydrated phyllosilicate mineral of aluminium and potassium with formula KAl_{2}(AlSi_{3}O_{10})(OH)_{2}. It has a highly perfect basal cleavage yielding remarkably thin laminae (sheets) which are often highly elastic. Sheets of muscovite 5 by 3 meters (16.4 ft × 9.8 ft) have been found in Nellore, India.

Muscovite has a Mohs hardness of 2–2.25 parallel to the [001] face, 4 perpendicular to the [001] and a specific gravity of 2.76–3. It can be colorless or tinted through grays, violet or red, and can be transparent or translucent. It is anisotropic and has high birefringence. Its crystal system is monoclinic. The green, chromium-rich variety is called fuchsite; mariposite is also a chromium-rich type of muscovite.

Muscovite is the most common mica, found in granites, pegmatites, gneisses, and schists, and as a contact metamorphic rock or as a secondary mineral resulting from the alteration of topaz, feldspar, kyanite, etc. It is characteristic of peraluminous rock, in which the content of aluminum is relatively high. In pegmatites, it is often found in immense sheets that are commercially valuable. Muscovite is in demand for the manufacture of fireproofing and insulating materials and to some extent as a lubricant.

== Naming ==
The name muscovite comes from Muscovy-glass, a name given to the mineral in Elizabethan England due to its use in medieval Russia (Muscovy) as a cheaper alternative to glass in windows. In cold countries, mica is inserted into windows in the form of large, beautiful window slabs, instead of glass, since it does not crack from the cold. This usage became widely known in England during the sixteenth century with its first mention appearing in letters by George Turberville, the secretary of England's ambassador to the Russian tsar Ivan the Terrible, in 1568.

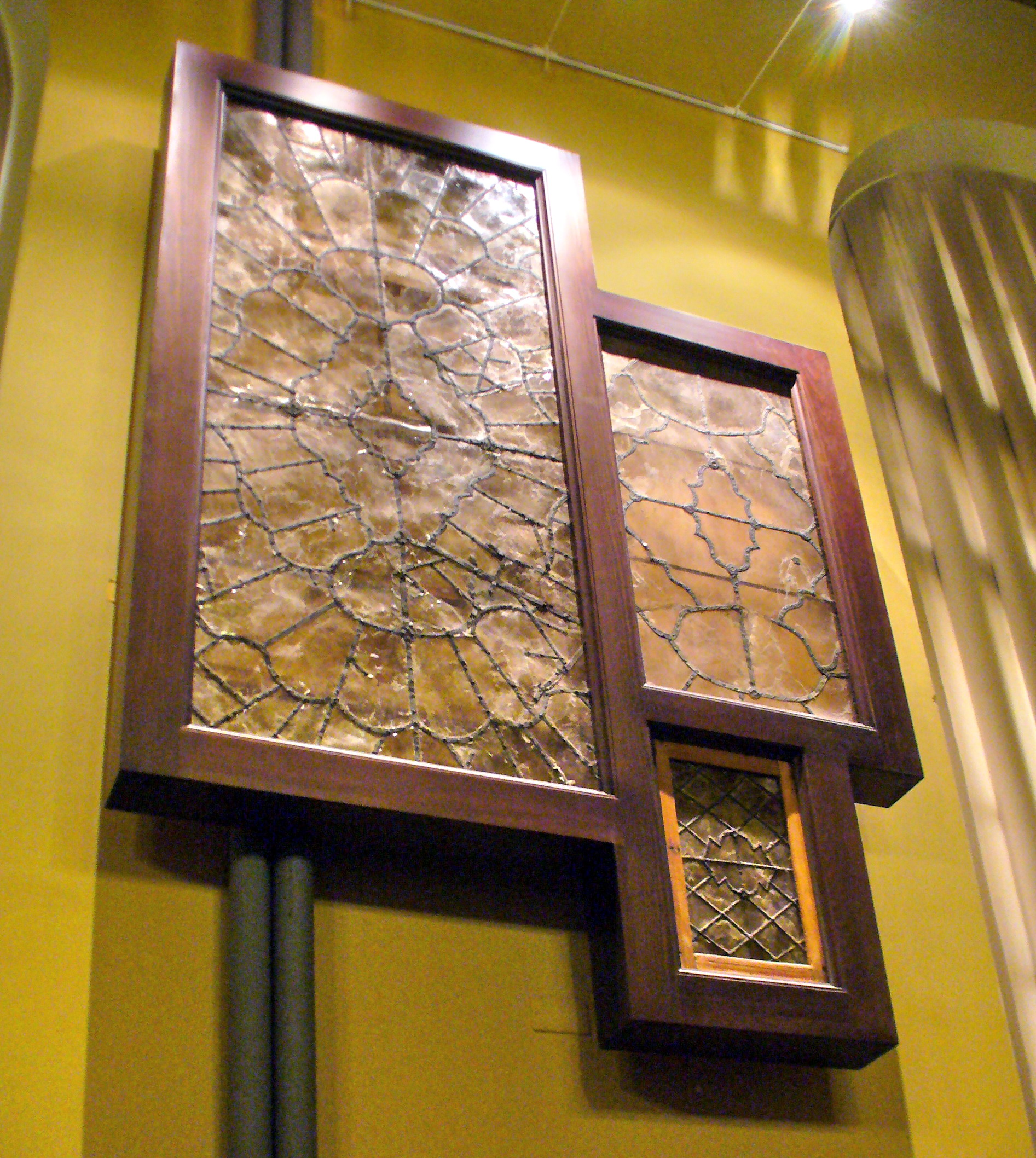
Muscovite window

== Distinguishing characteristics ==
Micas are distinguished from other minerals by their pseudohexagonal crystal shape and their perfect cleavage, which allows the crystals to be pulled apart into very thin elastic sheets. Pyrophyllite and talc are softer than micas and have a greasy feel, while chlorite is green in color and its cleavage sheets are inelastic. The other common mica, biotite, is almost always much darker in color than muscovite. Paragonite can be difficult to distinguish from muscovite but is much less common, though it is likely mistaken for muscovite often enough that it may be more common than is generally appreciated. Muscovite mica from Brazil is red due to manganese(3+).

== Composition and structure ==
Like all mica minerals, muscovite is a phyllosilicate (sheet silicate) mineral with a TOT-c structure. In other words, a crystal of muscovite consists of layers (TOT) bonded to each other by potassium cations (c).

Each layer is composed of three sheets. The outer sheets ('T' or tetrahedral sheets) consist of silicon-oxygen tetrahedra and aluminium-oxygen tetrahedra, with three of the oxygen anions of each tetrahedron shared with neighboring tetrahedra to form a hexagonal sheet. The fourth oxygen anion in each tetrahedral sheet is called an apical oxygen anion. There are three silicon cations for each aluminium cation but the arrangement of aluminium and silicon cations is largely disordered.

The middle octahedral (O) sheet consists of aluminium cations that are each surrounded by six oxygen or hydroxide anions forming an octahedron, with the octahedrons sharing anions to form a hexagonal sheet similar to the tetrahedral sheets. The apical oxygen anions of the outer T sheets face inwards and are shared by the octahedral sheet, binding the sheets firmly together. The relatively strong binding between oxygen anions and aluminium and silicon cations within a layer, compared with the weaker binding of potassium cations between layers, gives muscovite its perfect basal cleavage.

In muscovite, alternate layers are slightly offset from each other, so that the structure repeats every two layers. This is called the 1M polytype of the general mica structure.

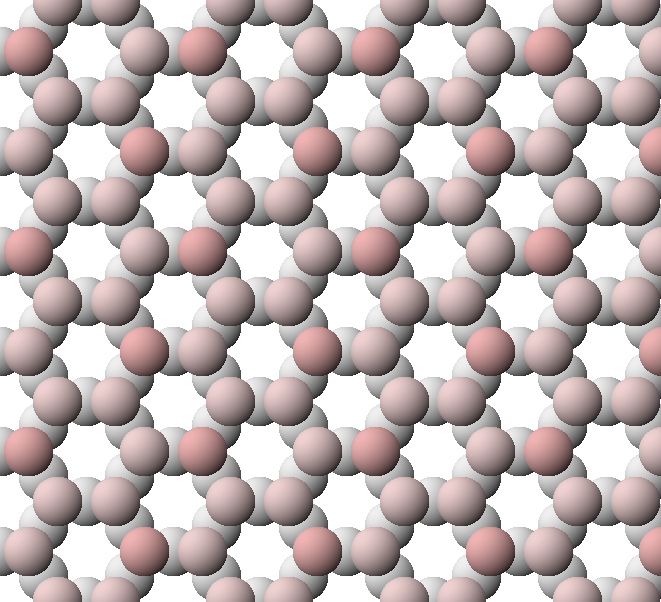
View of tetrahedral sheet of muscovite. The apical oxygen ions are tinted pink.

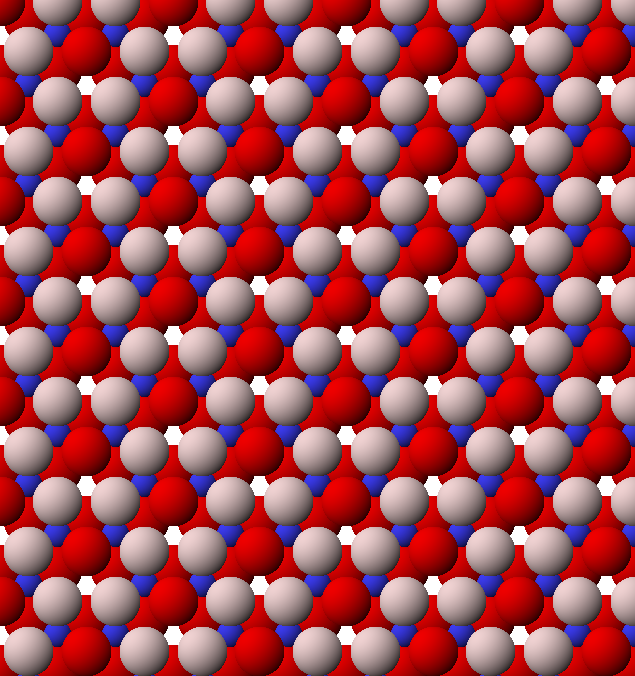
View of octahedral sheet of muscovite. The binding sites for apical oxygen are shown as white spheres.

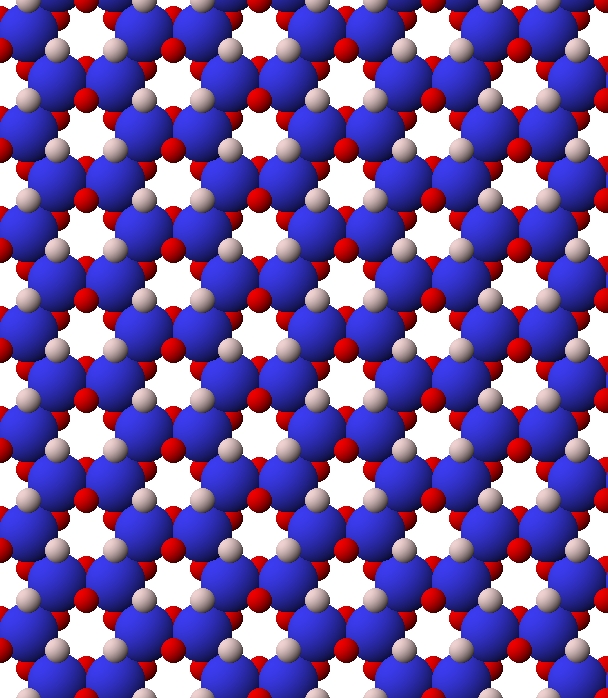
View of octahedral sheet of muscovite with ion sizes altered to emphasizing octahedral sites

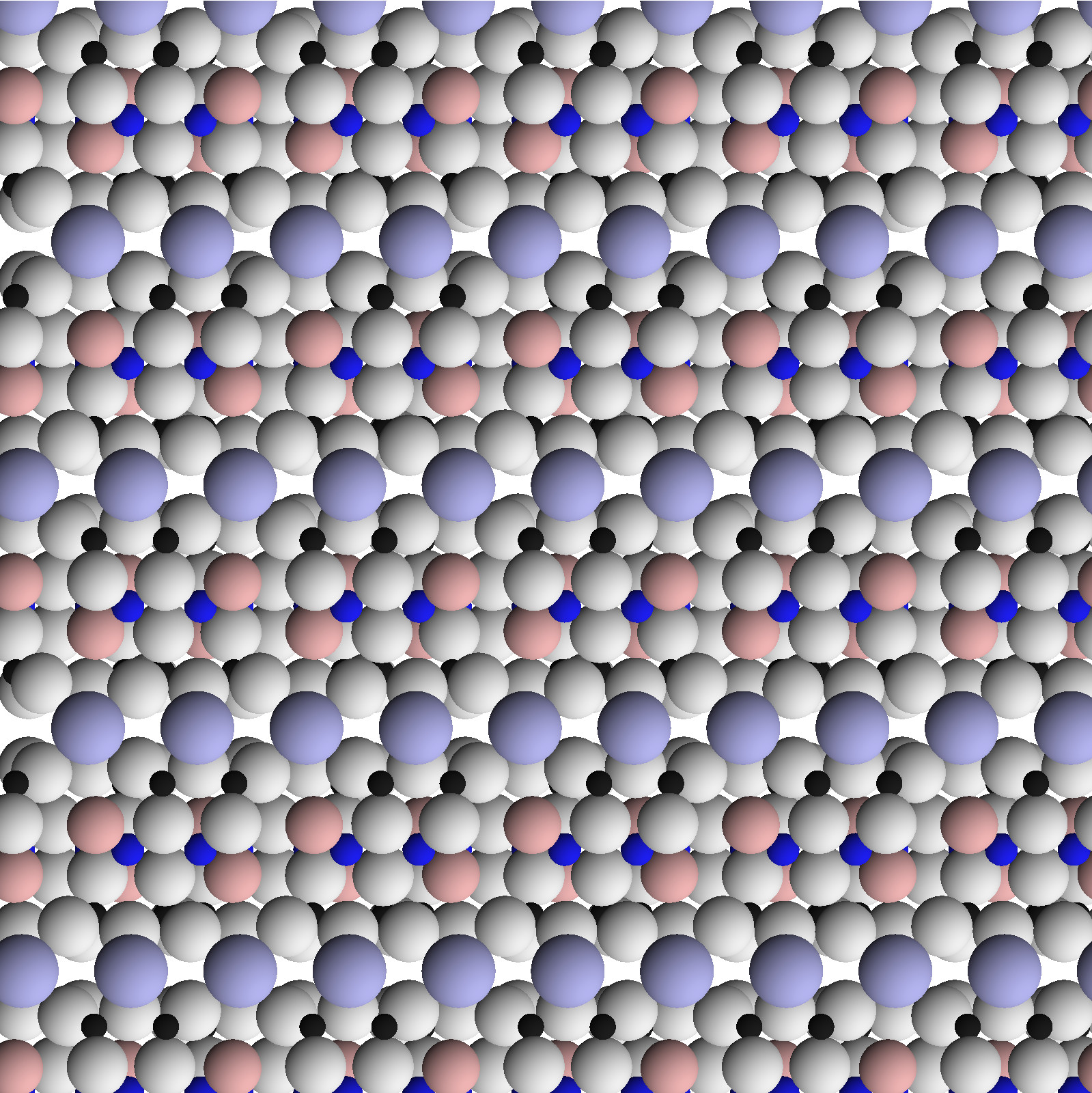
Structure of muscovite, viewed in the [100] direction (along the layers of the crystal)

The formula for muscovite is typically given as KAl_{2}(AlSi_{3}O_{10})(OH)_{2}, much more rarely as the double (K_{2}Al_{6}Si_{6}O_{20}(OH)_{4}), but it is common for small amounts of other elements to substitute for the main constituents. Alkali metals such as sodium, rubidium, and caesium substitute for potassium; magnesium, iron, lithium, chromium, titanium, or vanadium can substitute for aluminium in the octahedral sheet; fluorine or chlorine can substitute for hydroxide; and the ratio of aluminium to silicon in the tetrahedral sheets can change to maintain charge balance where necessary (as when magnesium cations, with a charge of +2, substitute for aluminium ions, with a charge of +3).

Up to 10% of the potassium may be replaced by sodium, and up to 20% of the hydroxide by fluorine. Chlorine rarely replaces more than 1% of the hydroxide. Muscovite in which the mole fraction of silicon is greater than aluminium, and magnesium or iron replaces some of the aluminium to maintain charge balance, is called phengite.

Chromium-rich and vanadium-rich muscovite are known respectively as fuchsite and roscoelite.

== Uses ==
Muscovite can be cleaved into very thin transparent sheets that can substitute for glass, particularly for high-temperature applications such as industrial furnace or oven windows. It is also used in the manufacture of a wide variety of electronics and as a filler in paints, plastic, and wallboard. It lends a silky luster to wallpaper. It is also used in tire manufacture as a mold release agent, in drilling mud, and in various cosmetics for its luster.

== Gallery ==
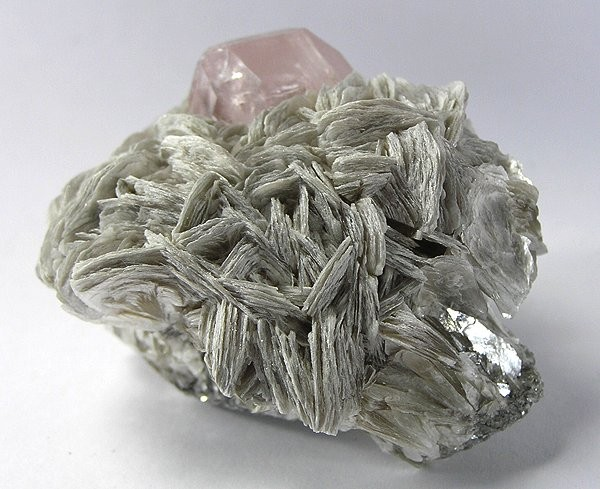
Muscovite with beryl, from Afghanistan

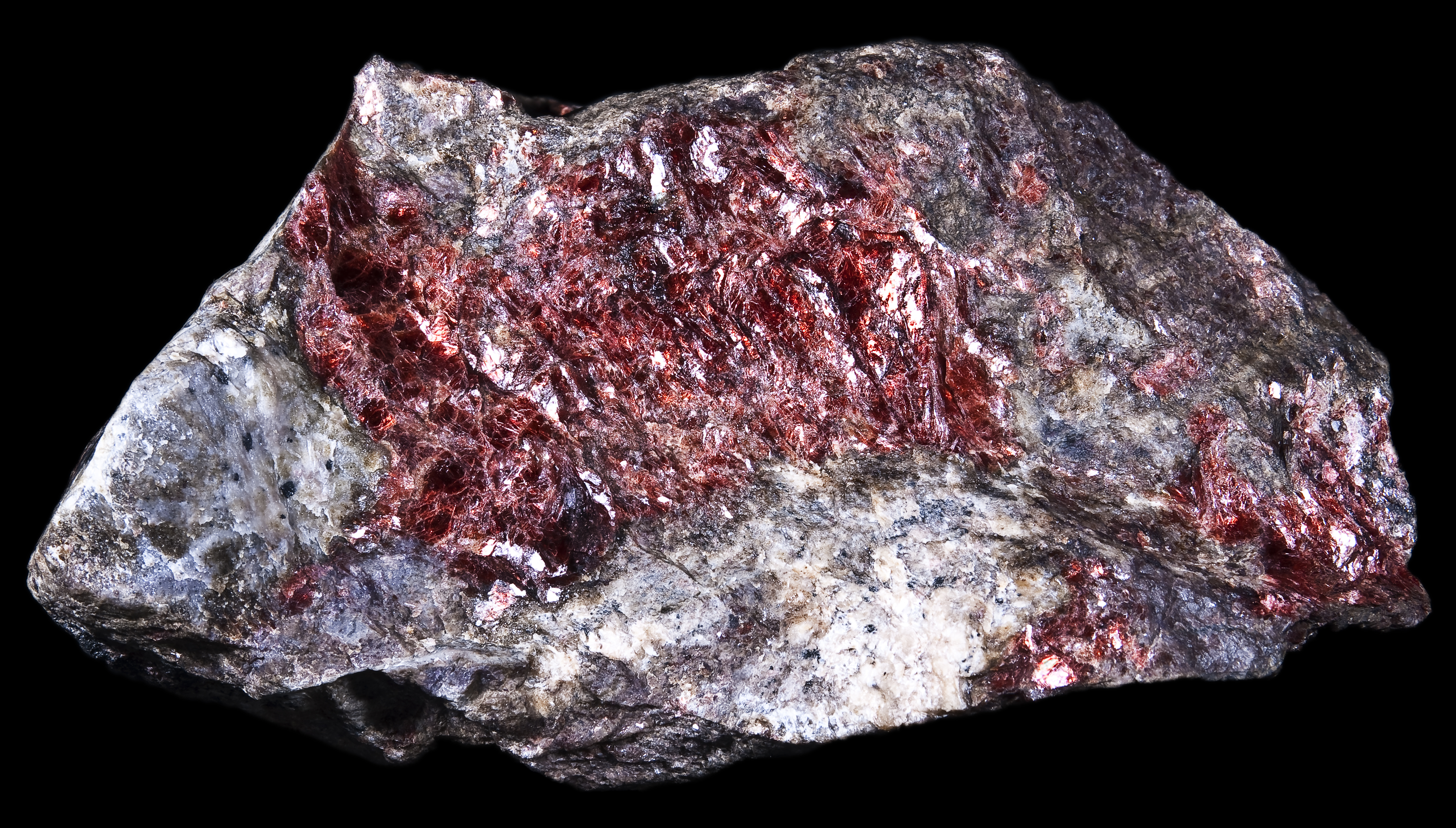
Alurgite, a red-purple manganese-rich variety of muscovite, from Italy

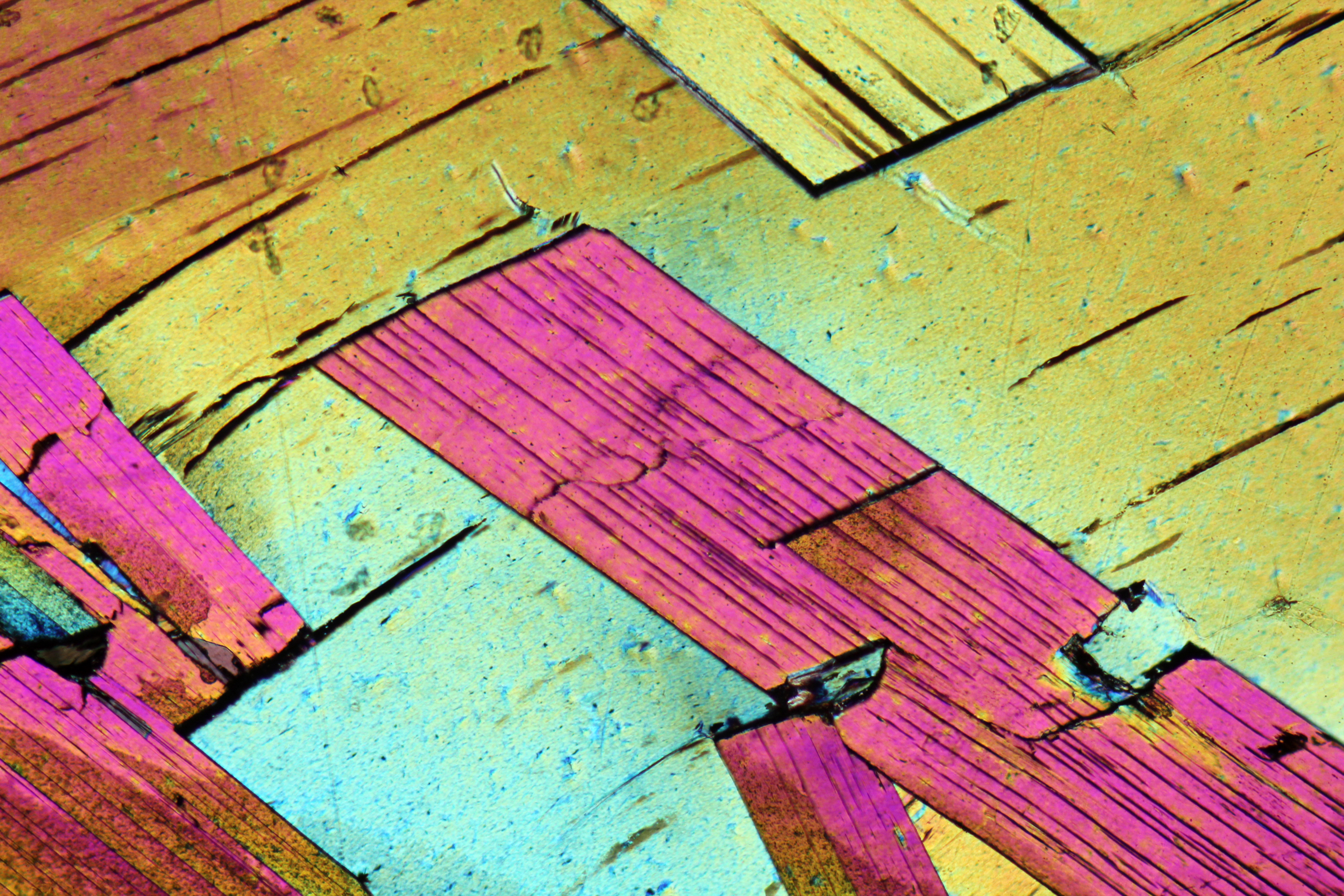
Tabular muscovite crystals in a gneiss in thin section viewed under cross-polarized light at 2x magnification
