= Diedorf =

- Municipality
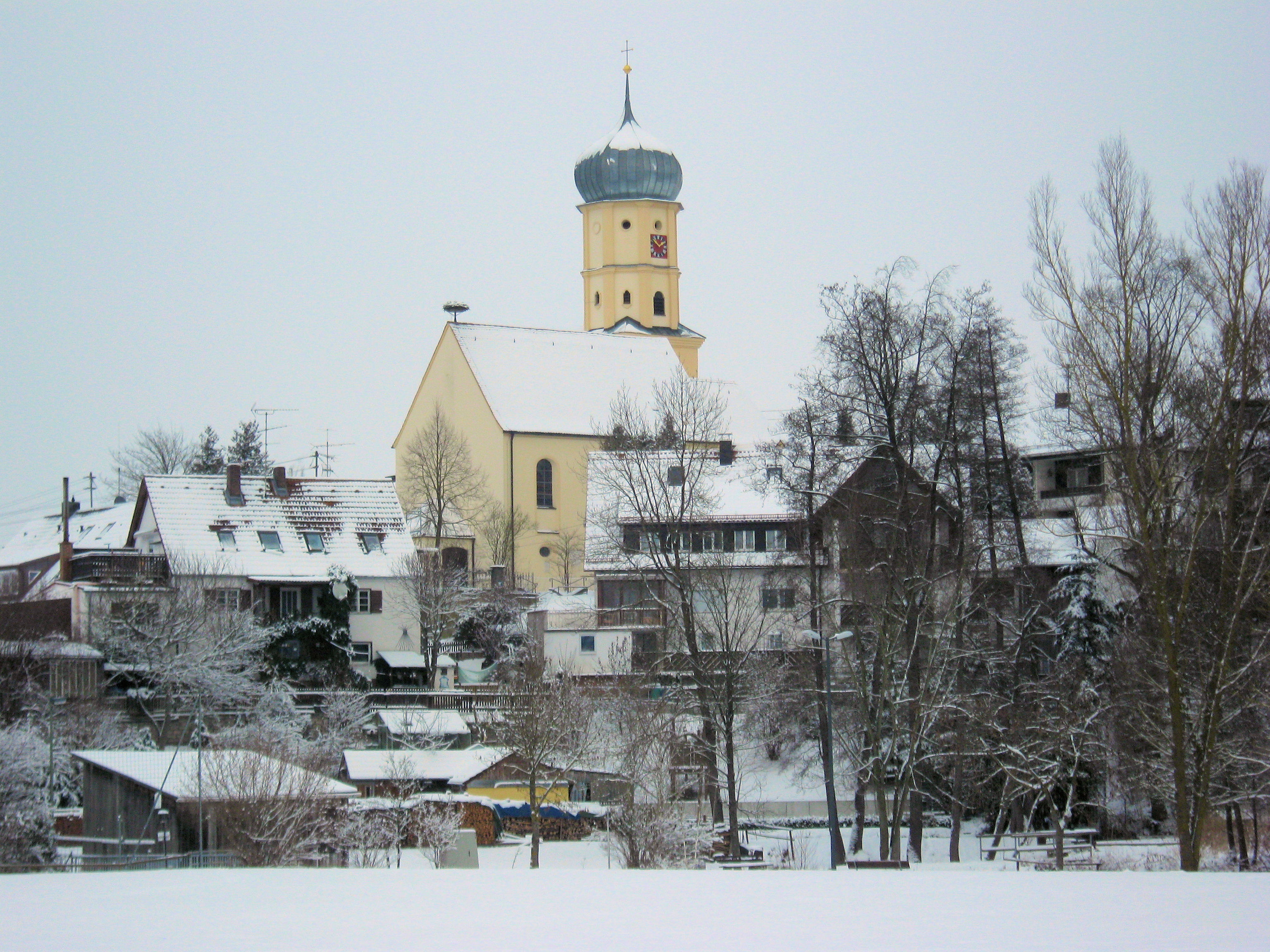
- Church of Saint Bartholomew

- Coat of arms

- Location of Diedorf within Augsburg district
- Interactive map of Diedorf
- Location within Germany Location within Bavaria
- Coordinates: 48°21′N 10°46′E
- Country: Germany
- State: Bavaria
- Admin. region: Schwaben
- District: Augsburg

Government
  - Mayor (2020–26): Peter Högg

Area
  - Total: 33.29 km^{2} (12.85 sq mi)
- Elevation: 485 m (1,591 ft)

Population (2025-12-31)
  - Total: 10,634
  - Density: 319.4/km^{2} (827.3/sq mi)
- Time zone: UTC+01:00 (CET)
  - Summer (DST): UTC+02:00 (CEST)
- Postal codes: 86420
- Dialling codes: 08238, 0821 (Biburg, Kreppen, Lettenbach, Vogelsang)
- Vehicle registration: A
- Website: www.markt-diedorf.de

Diedorf (German pronunciation: [ˈdiːdɔʁf]) is a municipality in the district of Augsburg, in Bavaria, Germany. It is situated on the river Schmutter, 9 km west of Augsburg city centre.

== Geography ==
The municipality of Diedorf consists of the market town of Diedorf and eight villages and hamlets: Anhausen, Biburg, Hausen, Kreppen, Lettenbach, Oggenhof, Vogelsang, and Willishausen.

== Economy ==
The paint manufacturer Keimfarben is headquartered here.
