= Lilian Rathmell =

British artist

- Born: 1909; Liverpool, England
- Died: 2000 (aged 90–91)
- Education: Liverpool College of Art; Cardiff College of Art
- Known for: Painting and textile art

Lilian Rathmell (1909–2000) was a British artist who painted and also produced fabric pieces, often of small model figures.

== Biography ==
Rathmell was born in Liverpool and attended Liverpool College of Art from 1929 to 1933 and returned to education when she studied dress design at Cardiff College of Art between 1957 and 1959. Throughout the 1960s and 1970s, Rathmell was a lecturer in both fine art and dress design at Newport College of Art and was also a costume designer with the Monmouthshire Youth Theatre.

As an artist, Rathmell produced paintings and fabric compositions. She was a member of both the Watercolour Society of Wales and the Welsh Group, taking part in group exhibitions with each, notably the 1983 touring exhibition, Wales 83.

A solo exhibition of Rathmell's work was held in 1981 at the Playhouse Gallery in London. She had a number of joint exhibitions with her family members, Thomas Rathmell (1912-1990), and Elizabeth Rathmell (1942-1994), including Three Painters in 1982 and The Rathmell Vision: People and Places which was hosted by the Taliesin Arts Centre in Swansea during 1991.

Examples of Rathmell's work are held by the Arts Council of Wales, the University of South Wales and Newport Museum and Art Gallery. Work by Thomas Rathnell is in the collection of the Contemporary Art Society for Wales.
