= Mineral painting =

Technique of fresco preparation and painting

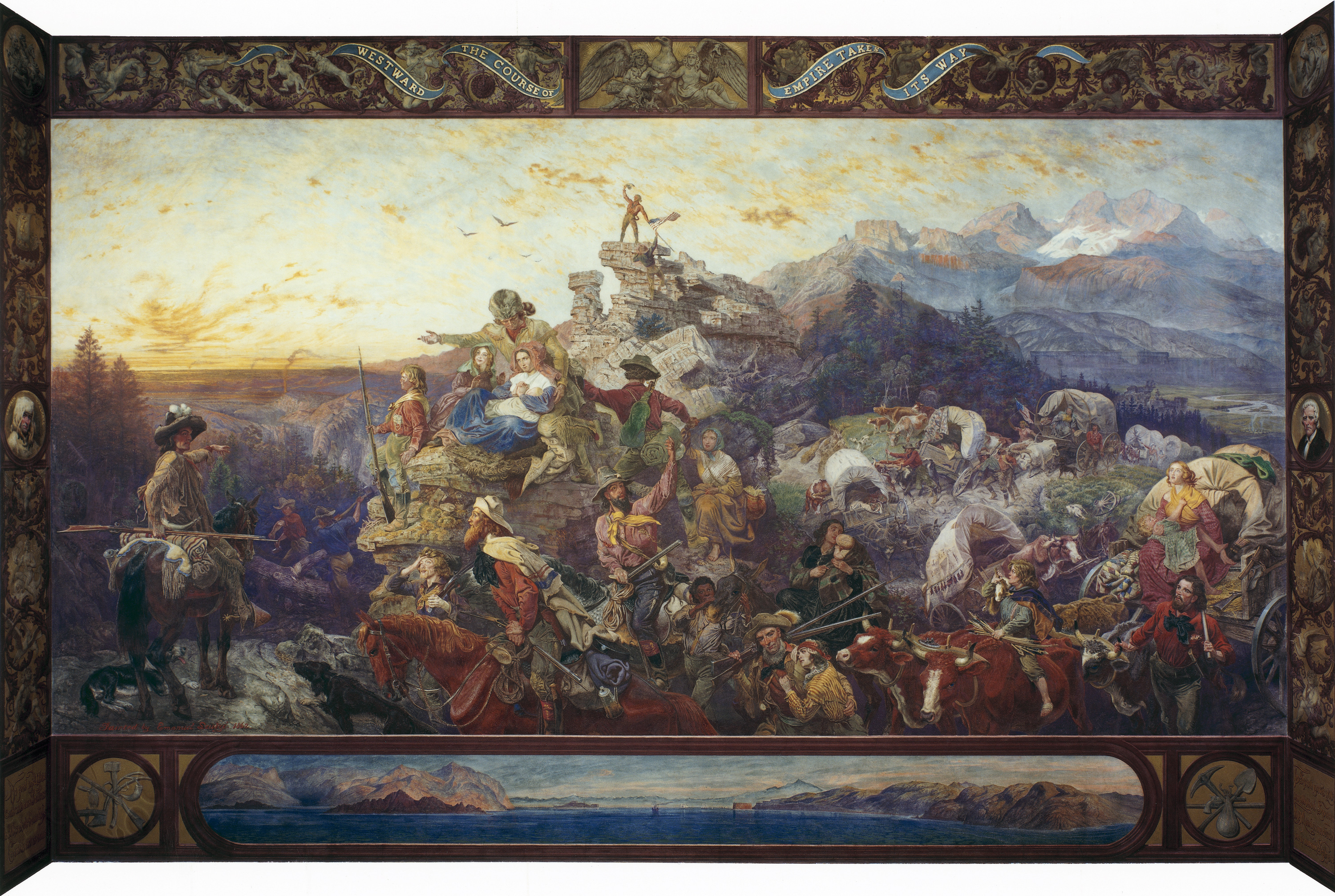
The mural Westward the Course of Empire Takes Its Way was made using stereochromy.

Mineral painting or Keim's process, also known as stereochromy, is a mural or fresco painting technique that uses a water glass-based paint to maximize the lifetime of the finished work.

The name "stereochromy" was first used in about 1825 by Johann Nepomuk von Fuchs and Schlotthaurer. In the original technique, pigments were applied to plaster or stone and sealed with water glass to preserve and enhance the colors. The method was then improved in the 1880s by Adolf Wilhelm Keim and renamed mineral painting or Keim's process.

== Keim's process ==
Keim's process was reported in 1884 at the Royal Society of Arts in London, by chemist and craftsman Adolf Wilhelm Keim of Munich, as an improvement on the earlier stereochromy technique of Schlotthauer and von Fuchs.

=== The process ===
- First, the surface to be painted is prepared by removing any damp bricks, overly burnt bricks, or decayed wood, and replacing these, and also removing any existing traces of stucco.
- The surface is then coated with a mixture of quartz sand, infusorial earth (calcined fossil meal), and powdered marble, mixed four parts to one with quicklime slaked with distilled water. The purpose of this layer is to ensure adhesion of the subsequent layers to the surface. Next, a layer of lime-sand mortar is applied to even the surface, with care taken to avoid cracking. This layer is allowed to dry for up to a year.
- Once dry, a painting ground composed of white quartz sand, marble sand, marble meal, and infusorial earth is combined eight parts to one with slaked lime, and applied to the surface at a thickness of one eighth to one quarter inch. This layer dries for several days, at which point a crust of carbonate has formed on the surface. This crust is removed with a mixture of one part hydrofluosilicic acid to three parts distilled water, which is brushed on and allowed to dry for 24 hours, after which the surface is rinsed with distilled water.
- A hardening fluid of one part potassium silicate to two parts water is then brushed on and allowed to dry for 24 hours, before a second layer is applied and allowed to dry again. This surface may be painted immediately, or may sit unpainted for several years.
- Pigments (selected from a set of thirty-eight) are treated with alkaline solutions of potash or ammonia to prevent color change caused by the alkaline fixative to come. Alternative pigments are best for those that cannot be used with an alkaline fixative.
- Finally, the completed painting is fixed with an application of "waterglass" (sodium silicate) treated with ammonium carbonate, applied in a fine spray in several layers, until no more is absorbed. The chemical interaction of the fixative with the underlying pigments and ground create a material analogous to marble, and highly resistant to chemical corrosion.

Keim's focus on carefully preparing the painting ground came from his study of older frescos and their state of preservation. Keim reportedly labored for twelve years to refine his process.

== See also ==
- Silicate mineral paint
