= Stanley Reed (artist) =

Painter (1908–1978)

Stanley Reed (1908–1978) was an English artist based in Liverpool, where he studied at the Liverpool School of Art. He was a painter in oils, mainly of portraits, and received several commissions from the Lord Mayors of Liverpool and Manchester. His works can be seen in the collections of the National Portrait Gallery, Walker Art Gallery, Abbot Hall Art Gallery, Manchester Jewish Museum, Williamson Art Gallery and Museum and Victoria Gallery & Museum.
