= Fuchsite =

Chromium variety of muscovite

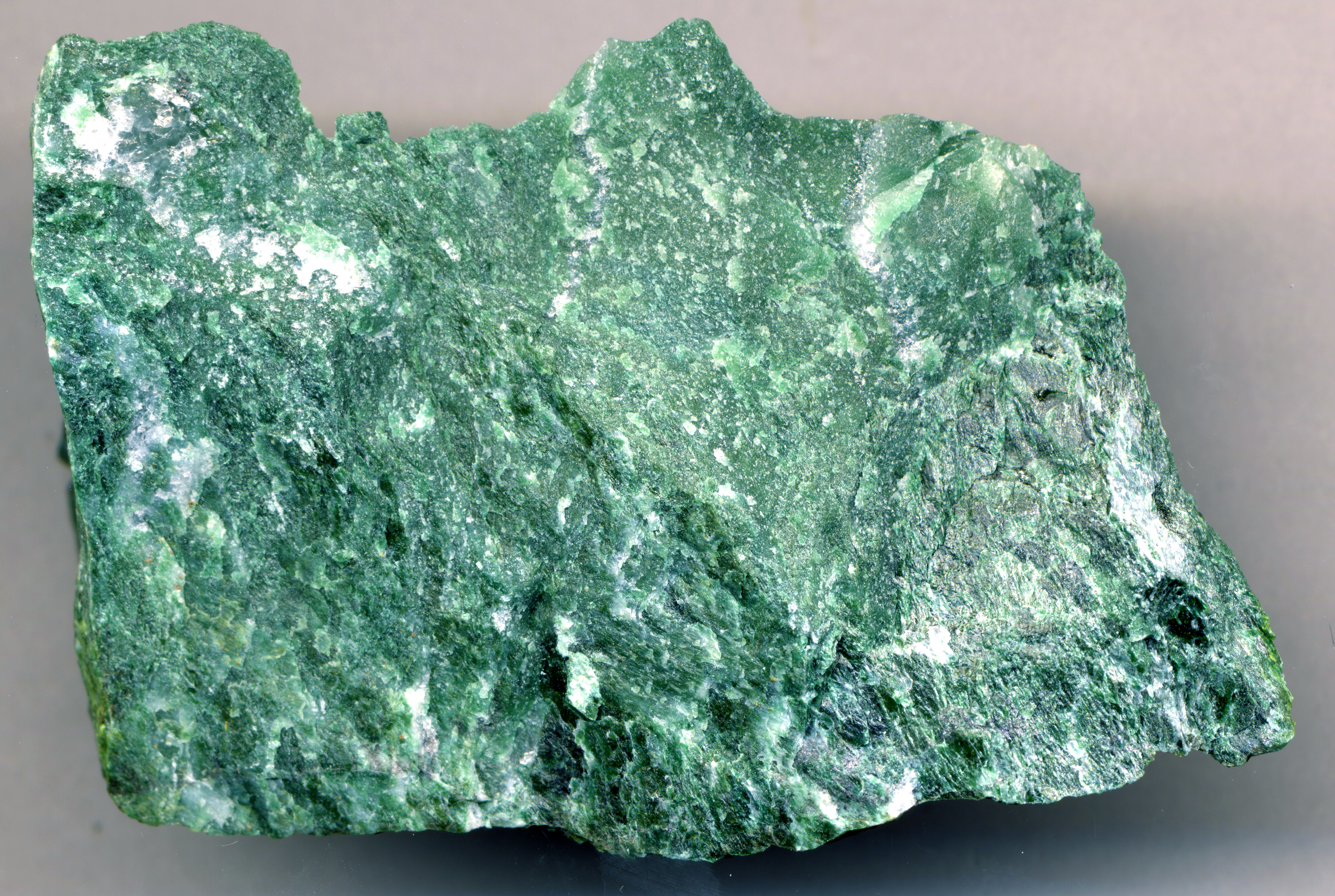
- Verdite, a microcrystalline metamorphic rock, is composed mostly of green fuchsite. This specimen (6.5 cm across at its base), of Archean age, is from Barberton, Mpumalanga, South Africa

General
- Category: Phyllosilicate minerals
- Group: Mica group, dioctahedral mica group
- Formula: K(Al,Cr)_{3}Si_{3}O_{10}(OH)_{2}
- IMA status: Variety of muscovite
- Crystal system: Monoclinic

Identification
- Color: Light to medium green
- Crystal habit: Curved aggregates
- Cleavage: Perfect basal
- Fracture: Uneven
- Mohs scale hardness: 2.5
- Luster: Vitreous to pearly
- Streak: White
- Diaphaneity: Transparent to opaque
- Specific gravity: 2.8–2.9
- Optical properties: Biaxial (–)
- Refractive index: 1.552–1.615
- Birefringence: 0.036
- Dispersion: weak

Fuchsite, also known as chrome mica, is a chromium (Cr)-rich variety of the mineral muscovite, belonging to the mica group of phyllosilicate minerals, with the chemical formula K(Al,Cr)_{3}Si_{3}O_{10}(OH)_{2}.

Trivalent chromium replaces one of the aluminium (Al) atoms in the general muscovite formula producing the apple green hue distinctive of fuchsite. It is often found in minute micaceous aggregates (with individual plates barely visible), as a major component of chromium rich phyllitic or schistose metamorphic rocks of the greenschist facies.

Verdite is a type of metamorphic rock made mostly of an impure, often multicolored, variety of fuchsite. It is used for ornamental carvings.

Fuchsite is named after the German chemist and mineralogist Johann Nepomuk von Fuchs.

== Properties ==
Fuchsite crystallizes in the monoclinic crystal system. Common colour of the mineral is pale green to emerald green depending on the amount of Cr substitution. The micaceous crystals are flexible and slightly sectile with a hardness of 2–2.5 on the Mohs scale. Fuchsite fluoresces lime green under long wave UV light. Fuchsite's radioactivity due to its ^{40}K content is barely detectable.
