= Kay Anderson =

British artist

- Born: 1902; Chingford, London
- Died: 1974 (aged 71–72); Surrey, England
- Education: Liverpool School of Art; Royal College of Art
- Known for: Paintings, lithography
- Spouse: Thomas Collingwood Clough (m. 1933)

Kathleen Anderson (1902–1974) was a British artist known for her paintings and lithographic work.

== Biography ==
Anderson was born in Chingford near London, to Alfred William Anderson, a church minister, and Agnes Anderson, both of whom were from Ireland. Kay Anderson was raised in Kent, then in Newport in south Wales and later in Liverpool. She studied art at the Liverpool School of Art and at the Royal College of Art in London, receiving her teaching diploma in 1927.

Anderson painted various subjects and topics in both oils and watercolours and also produced etchings, engravings and lithographs. Anderson exhibited at the Royal Academy in London, with the New English Art Club and at the Paris Salon in France and also showed paintings in Chicago and in Canada. Anderson married the artist Thomas Collingwood Clough in 1933 and the couple lived in Surrey, where she died in 1974. The British Museum and the Victoria and Albert Museum in London hold examples of her work as does the Christchurch Art Gallery in New Zealand.
