= Mariposite =

Chromium-rich variety of mica

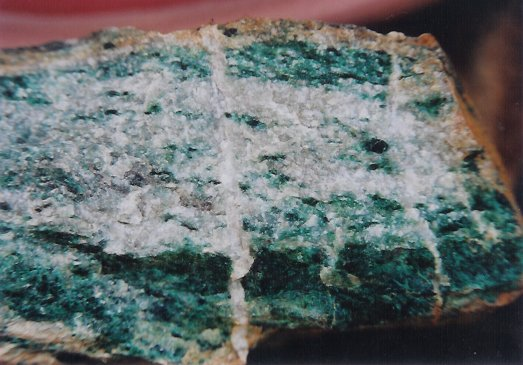
Cross-section of a rock with mariposite

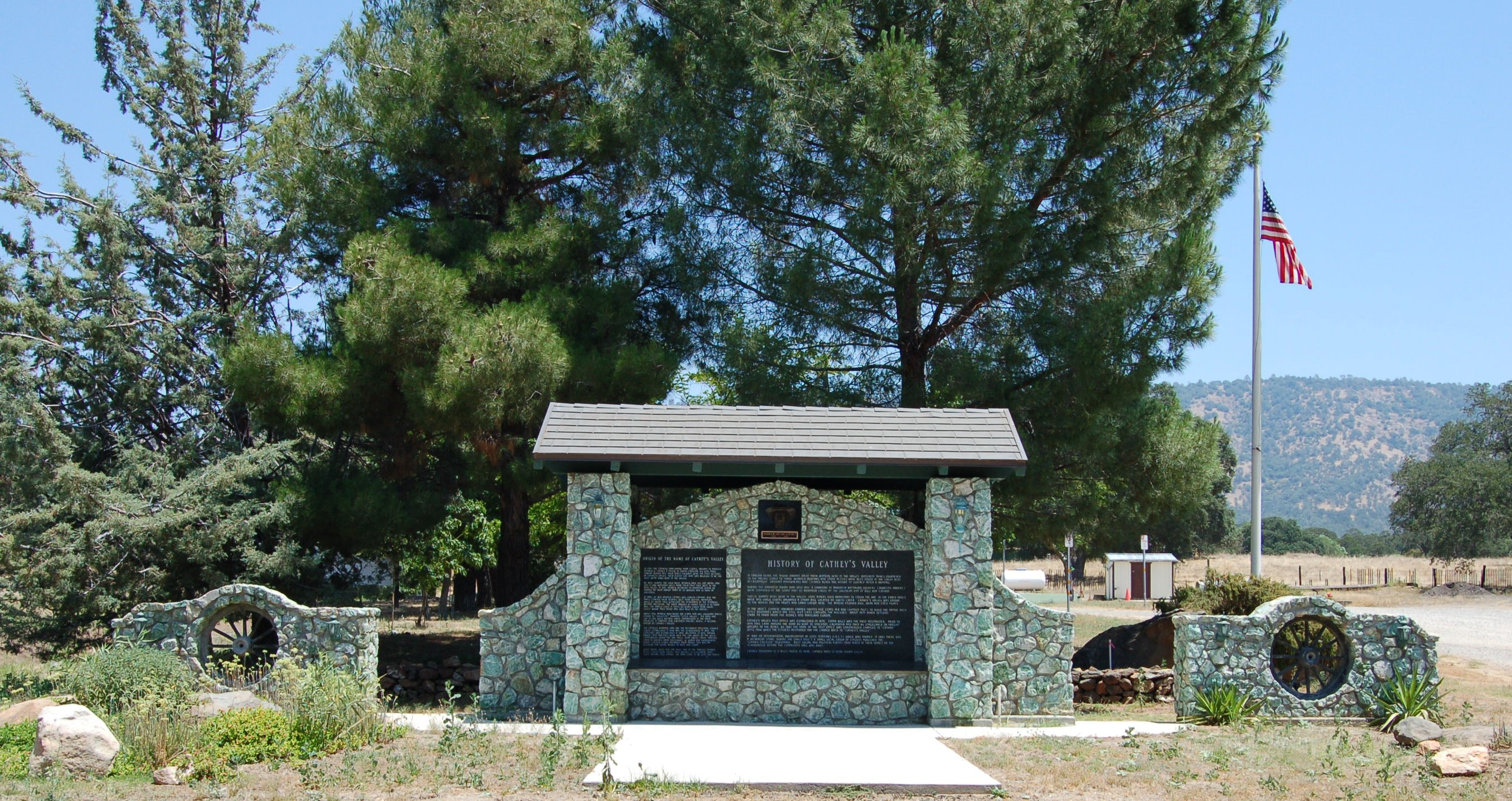
A monument in Cathey's Valley, a community in Mariposa County, California, utilizing mariposite

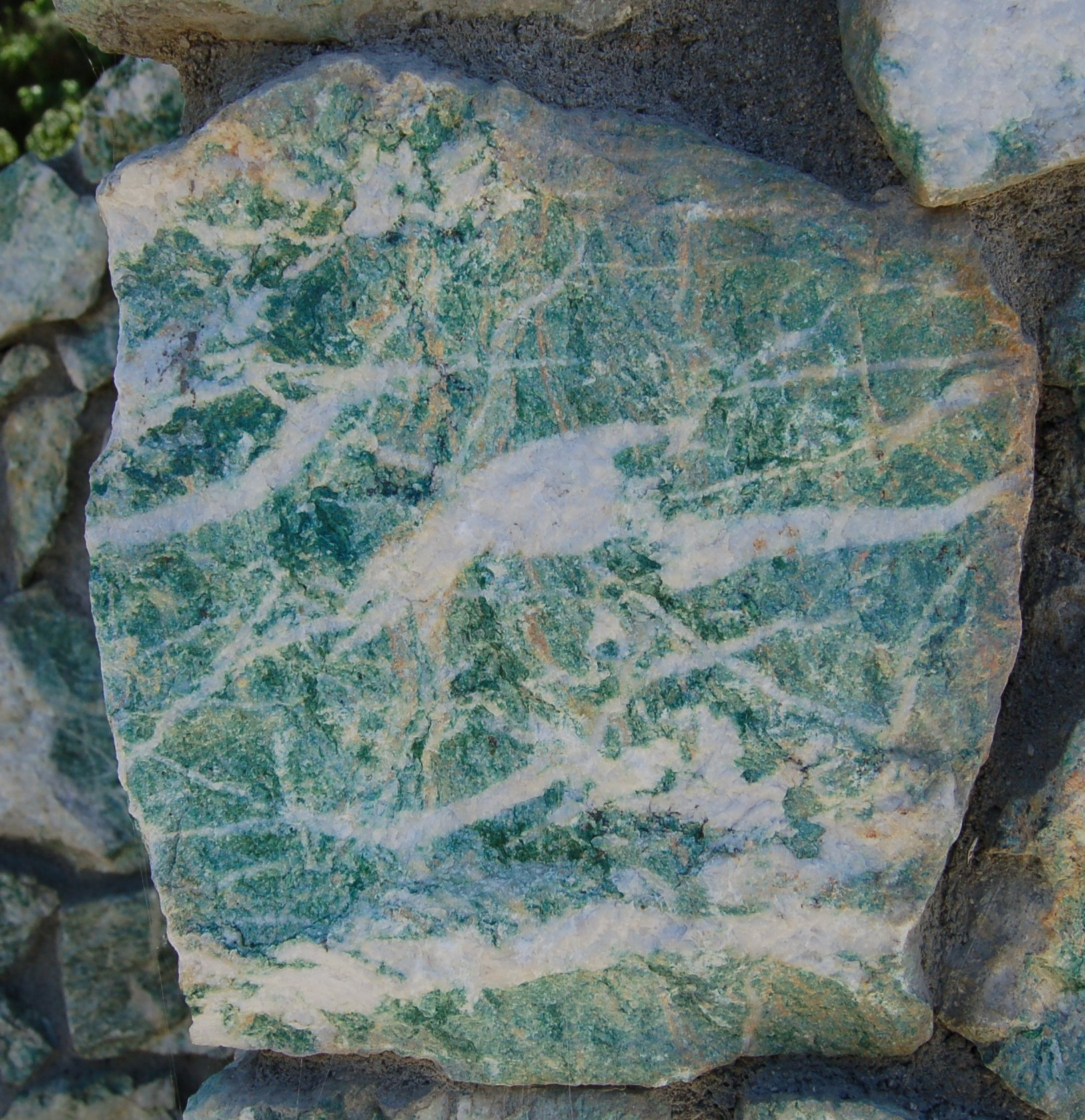
A close-up of one of the rocks in the monument in Cathey's Valley

Mariposite is a mineral which is a chromium-rich variety of mica, which imparts an attractive green color to the generally white dolomitic marble in which it is commonly found. It was named for Mariposa, California, United States, though it can be found in several other places in the Sierra Nevada. It is also found in Marblemount, Washington, in the North Cascades, as well as in a few locations in Canada (Newfoundland, where it is called virginite, Ontario, and Quebec). Mariposite has also been found outside North America: in France, Austria, Spain, Sweden, China, Japan, Papua New Guinea, and Venezuela.

It is not recognized as a valid mineral by the International Mineralogical Association, but is a chromium-rich phengite, which is a high-silica variety of muscovite. It is the chromium that gives mariposite its distinctive green color.

The term "mariposite" also refers to the stone in which the green mica is found. This stone is metamorphic rock, containing varying amounts of dolomite and quartz. Larger proportions of quartz give it a more attractive, translucent appearance. It is used as a decorative construction material, in walls, monuments, and bridges. It is also made into jewelry.

== Chemical composition ==
The chemical formula of mariposite is K(Al,Cr)_{2}(Al,Si)_{4}O_{10}(OH)_{2}.
