= John Lennon Art and Design Building =

Building of Liverpool John Moores University

Coordinates: 53.4051°N 2.9704°W

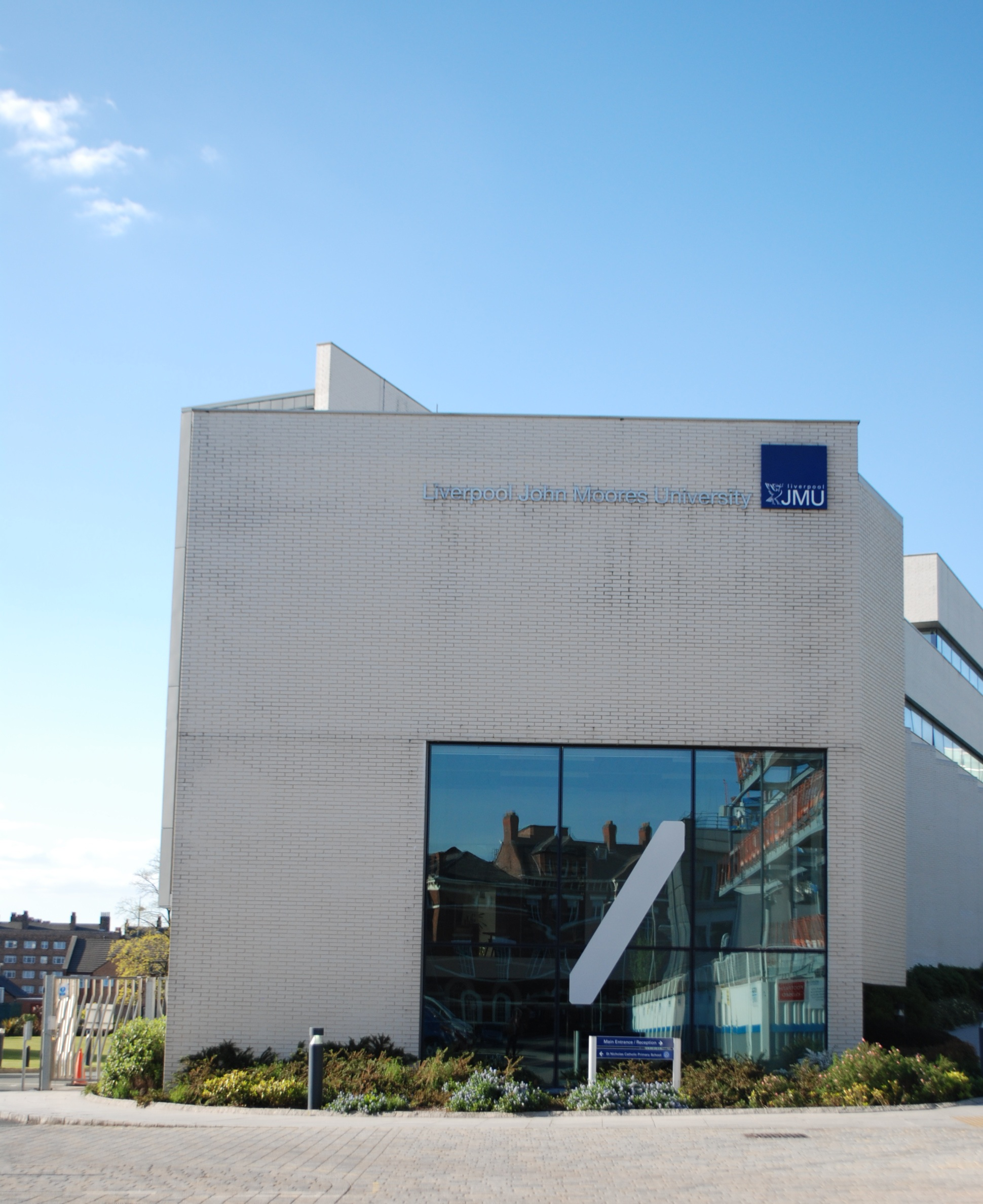
The John Lennon Art and Design Building viewed from Great Orford Street

The John Lennon Art and Design Building (formerly the Art and Design Academy) in Liverpool, England, houses Liverpool John Moores University's School of Art and Design. The school was formerly located at the Grade II listed Liverpool College of Art.

It is located at Duckinfield Street in LJMU's Mount Pleasant Campus, immediately adjacent to the Liverpool Metropolitan Cathedral. The six-storey building was constructed between 2005 and 2008 at a cost of £27 million. The RIBA award winning John Lennon Art and Design Building was designed by Rick Mather Architects, during construction the contractor was Wates Construction and the structural and services engineer was Ramboll UK. The building was officially renamed on the 1 July 2013 after John Lennon's widow, Yoko Ono, gave the university her blessing to use the Lennon name in recognition of her husband's links with the College of Art and the City of Liverpool.

The John Lennon Art and Design Building has a gross internal area of 11,608 m^{2} (124,950 sq ft) and contains 175 m^{2} (1,880 sq ft) of public exhibition space, alongside a number of lecture theatres, seminar rooms and a large auditorium. ICT facilities, workshops and a café are also located in the building. The building houses a public gallery and a public café.

== History ==
Liverpool School of Art and Design is the oldest art and design school in England outside London. In 1825, Liverpool Mechanics’ School of Art Institute was established, providing and education for working men. In 1856 the school had changed name to become The Liverpool Institute and School of Art. This then moved to Liverpool College of Art on Hope Street in 1880 to a new building to house the School of Art. In 2000, the school developed to cater for a much broader field of subjects and it moved into the current building in 2008.

== Awards ==
The building has received several awards. In 2011 it received the Civic Trust Award and in 2010 it received the WAN Education Sector Award.

== Exhibitions ==
The school has hosted several exhibitions, including the prestigious RIBA President's Medals Students Award. Each year the school hosts a degree show with students displaying work from Architecture, Fashion, Fine Art and Graphic Design and Illustration. The fashion graduates also present their work in a fashion show. The school hosts the Exhibition Research Lab, the UK's first centre for the study of exhibition cultures. Opened in 2012, the ERL has hosted exhibitions of work by Adrian Henri, György Kepes and L’Internationale.

== Alumni ==
- David Gray – musician

For Alumni of Liverpool College of Art, see Liverpool College of Art

== Gallery ==
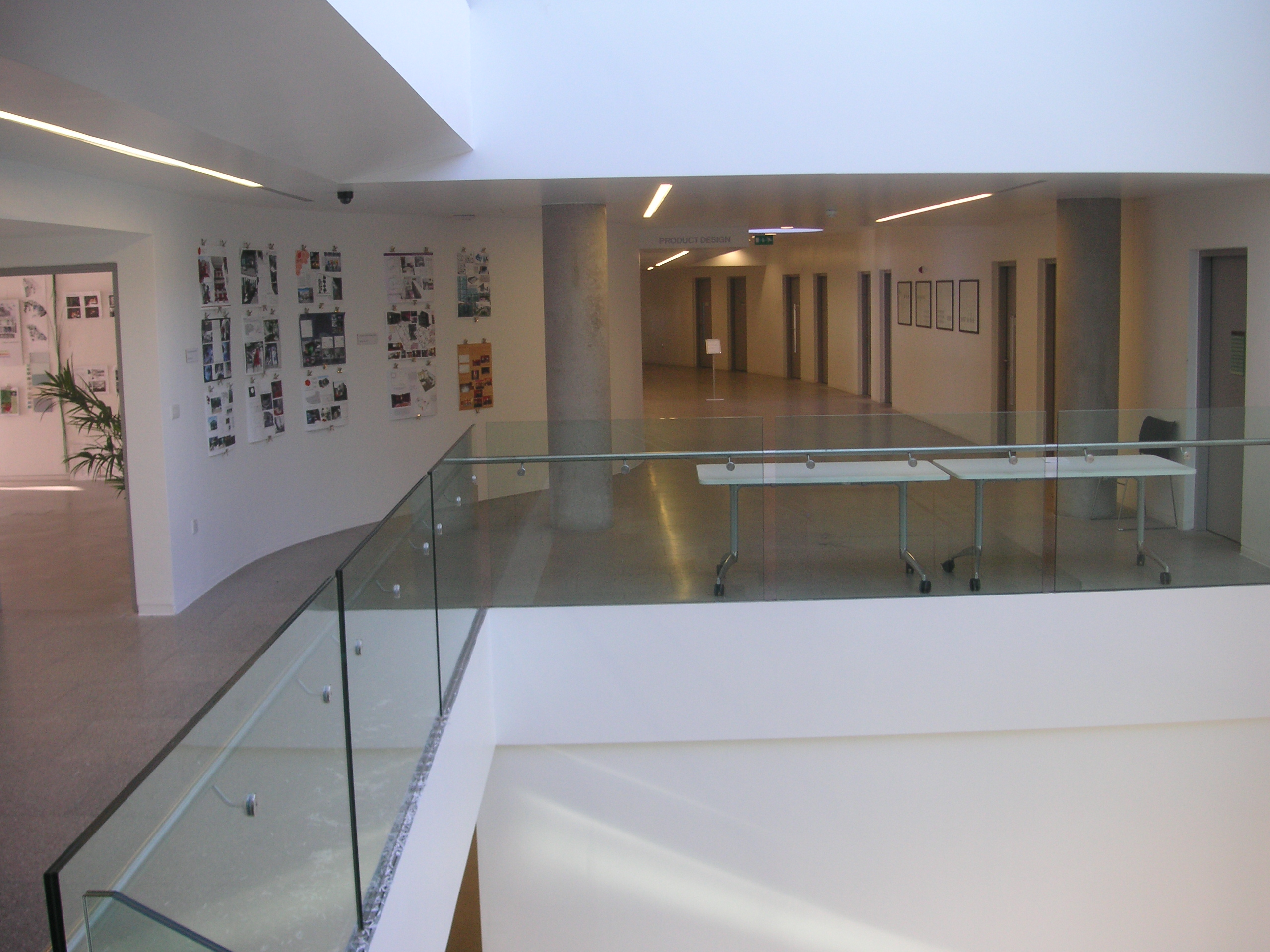
Corridor

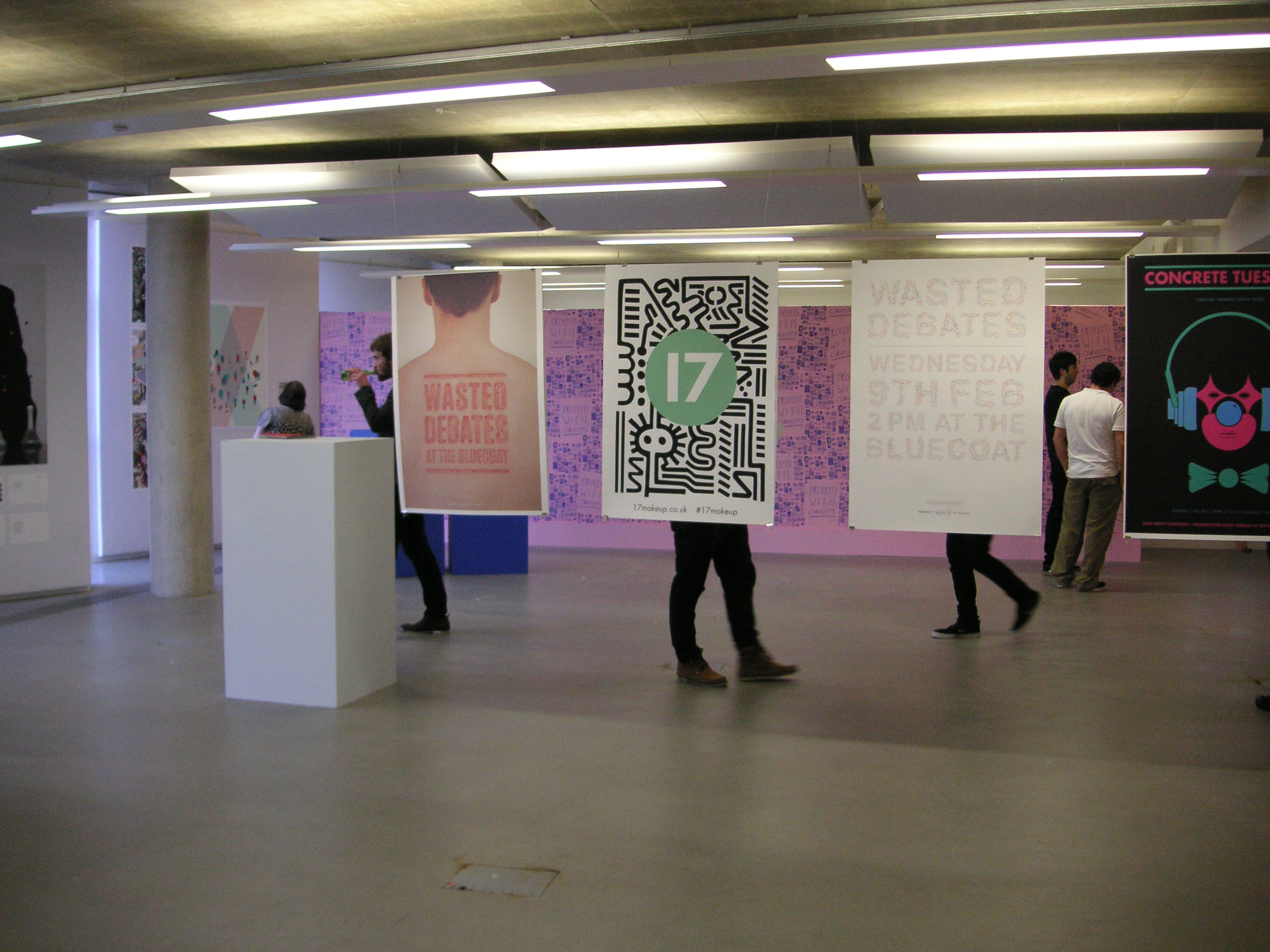
Gallery

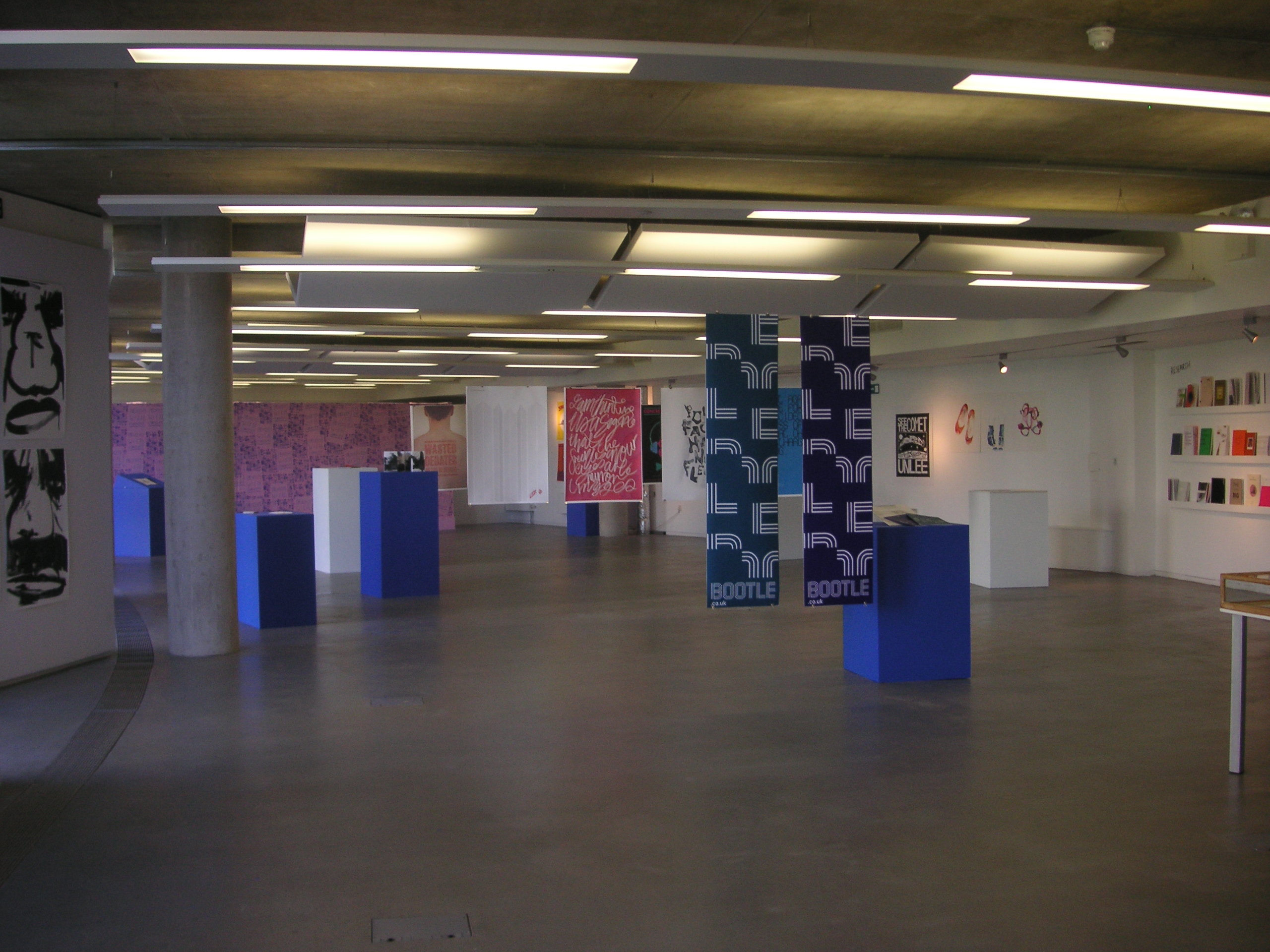
Studio space in the degree show
