= Moppin Complex =

Geologic formation in New Mexico, US

- Stratigraphic range: Statherian
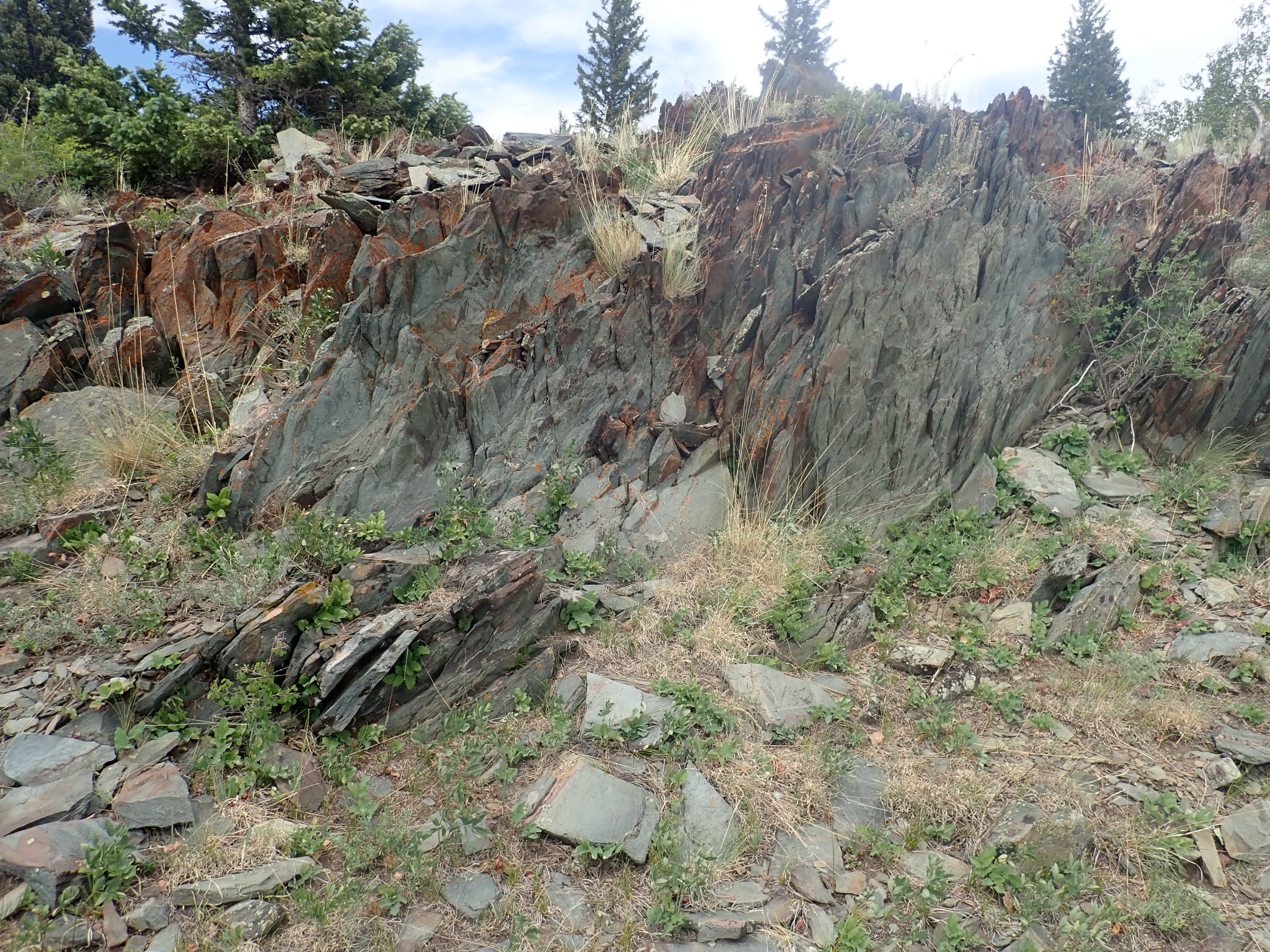
- Moppin Complex at the Iron Mountain reference section
- Type: Complex
- Underlies: Vadito Group

Lithology
- Primary: Metavolcanic rock
- Other: Metasedimentary rock

Location
- Coordinates: 36.724°N 106.238°W
- Region: Tusas Mountains, New Mexico
- Country: United States

Type section
- Named for: Moppin Ranch
- Named by: F. Barker
- Year defined: 1958
- Moppin Complex (the United States) Moppin Complex (New Mexico)

The Moppin Complex is a Precambrian geologic complex found in the Tusas Mountains of northern New Mexico. It has not been directly dated, but is thought to be Statherian based on a minimum age of 1.755 Gya from radiometric dating of magmatic intrusions.

== Description ==
The Moppin Complex consists mostly of chlorite schist (greenschist) and amphibolite, but with lesser amounts of many other rock types, including metaconglomerate, phyllite, gneiss, and muscovite schist. Feldspathic schist and banded iron formation are also present. The banded iron is of the Algoma variety, formed by local volcanism rather than in the Great Oxidation Event. Pillow lavas can be discerned at some locations and the overall composition of the chlorite schist is that of altered basalt. Major element and oxygen isotope ratios suggest the protolith was tholeiite. Exposures of amphibolite along Cow Creek (36.642°N 106.109°W) are almost entirely very fine-grained hornblende and oligoclase.

The complex crops out in the Tusas Mountains along a belt from American Creek (36.630°N 106.072°W) to Jawbone Mountain (36.743°N 106.244°W). Its base is nowhere exposed, but it is at least a few thousand meters (several thousand feet) thick. Based on gravity measurements, the dense rock of the complex may extend in the subsurface well to the north and east into the San Juan basin.

The Moppin Complex is intruded by plutonic rocks, including the Maquinita Granodiorite, the trondjhemite of Rio Brazos, dikes and sills of the Burned Mountain Formation, the Tusas Mountain Orthogneiss, and the Tres Piedras Orthogneiss. The Maquinita Granodiorite has a uranium-lead radiometric age of 1.755 Gya, which constrains the minimum age of the Moppin Complex. This makes the Moppin Complex one of the oldest known rock units in New Mexico. It likely correlates with the Pecos Complex of the Santa Fe Mountains and the Gold Hill Complex of the Taos Mountains

The complex is overlain by the Vadito Group. The lower part of the Vadito Group contains amphibolite bodies that may be transitional with the Moppin Complex.

The unit is interpreted as a portion of an island arc accreted to the southern margin of Laurentia as part of the Yavapai Province between 1.8 and 1.755 Gya. The unit was intruded by the Tres Piedras Orthogneiss between 1.700 and 1.693 Gya as part of the transition from the Yavapai orogeny to the Mazatzal orogeny, and further deformed between 1.45 and 1.35 Gya.

== Economic geology ==
Gold has been mined in the Moppin Complex and comes from volcanogenic massive-sulfide deposits. Banded iron formation may amount to 100 million tons of low-grade iron ore, but this is not presently economically recoverable.

== History of investigation ==
The rock beds making up the Moppin Complex were originally named the Hopewell Series in by Evan Just in 1937 during an investigation of pegmatites in the Tusas Mountains. However, this name was already in use, and the unit was renamed the Moppin metavolcanic series by Fred Barker in 1958. With the recognition that the lithology was more diverse, including metasedimentary as well as metavolcanic rock, the unit was renamed as the Moppin Complex by Bauer and Williams in their sweeping revision of the stratigraphy of northern New Mexico Proterozoic rock units in 1989. They also designated three reference sections.

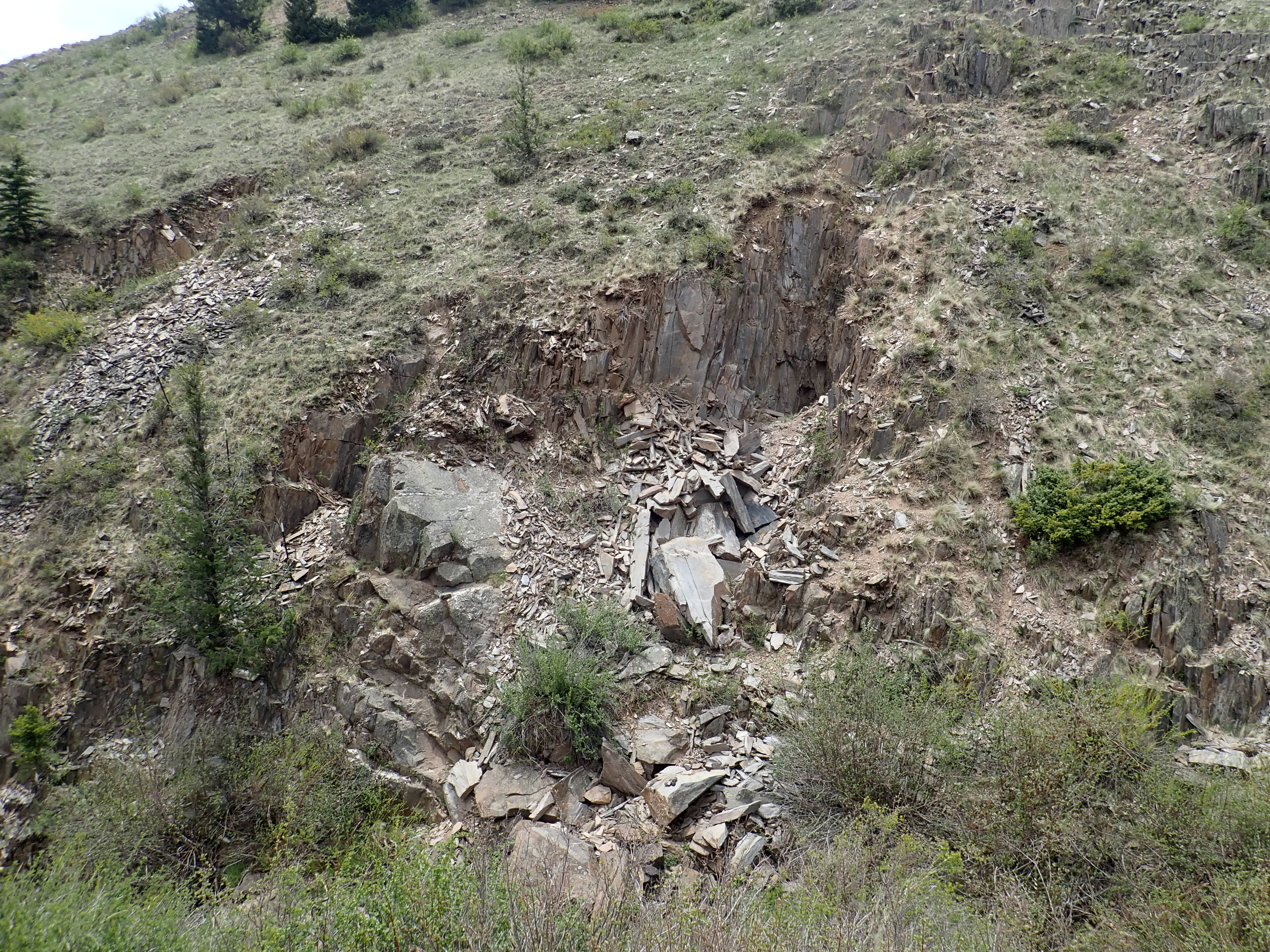
Moppin Complex at Placer Creek.

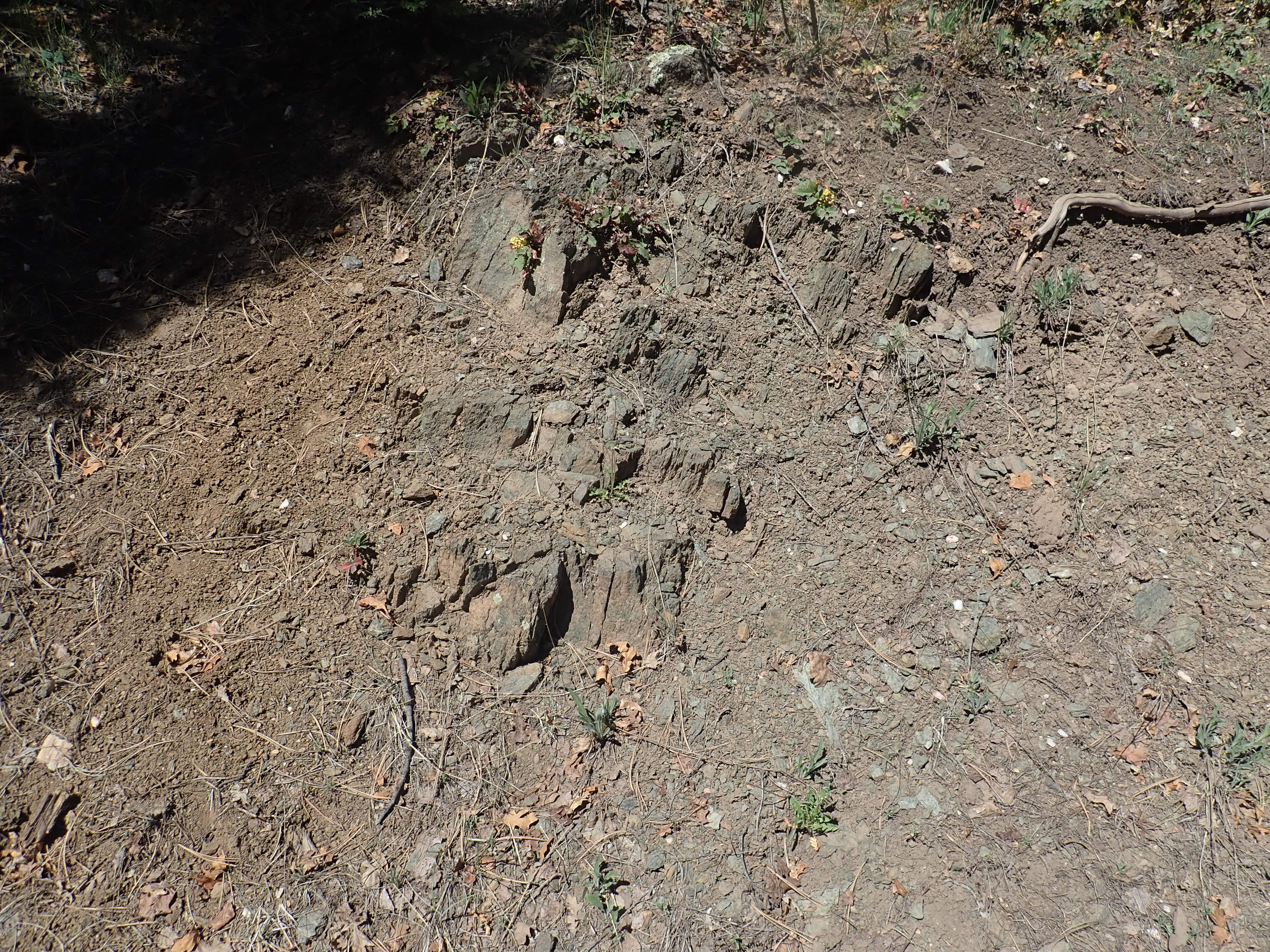
Greenschist of the Moppin Complex. This is the predominant rock type in the complex.

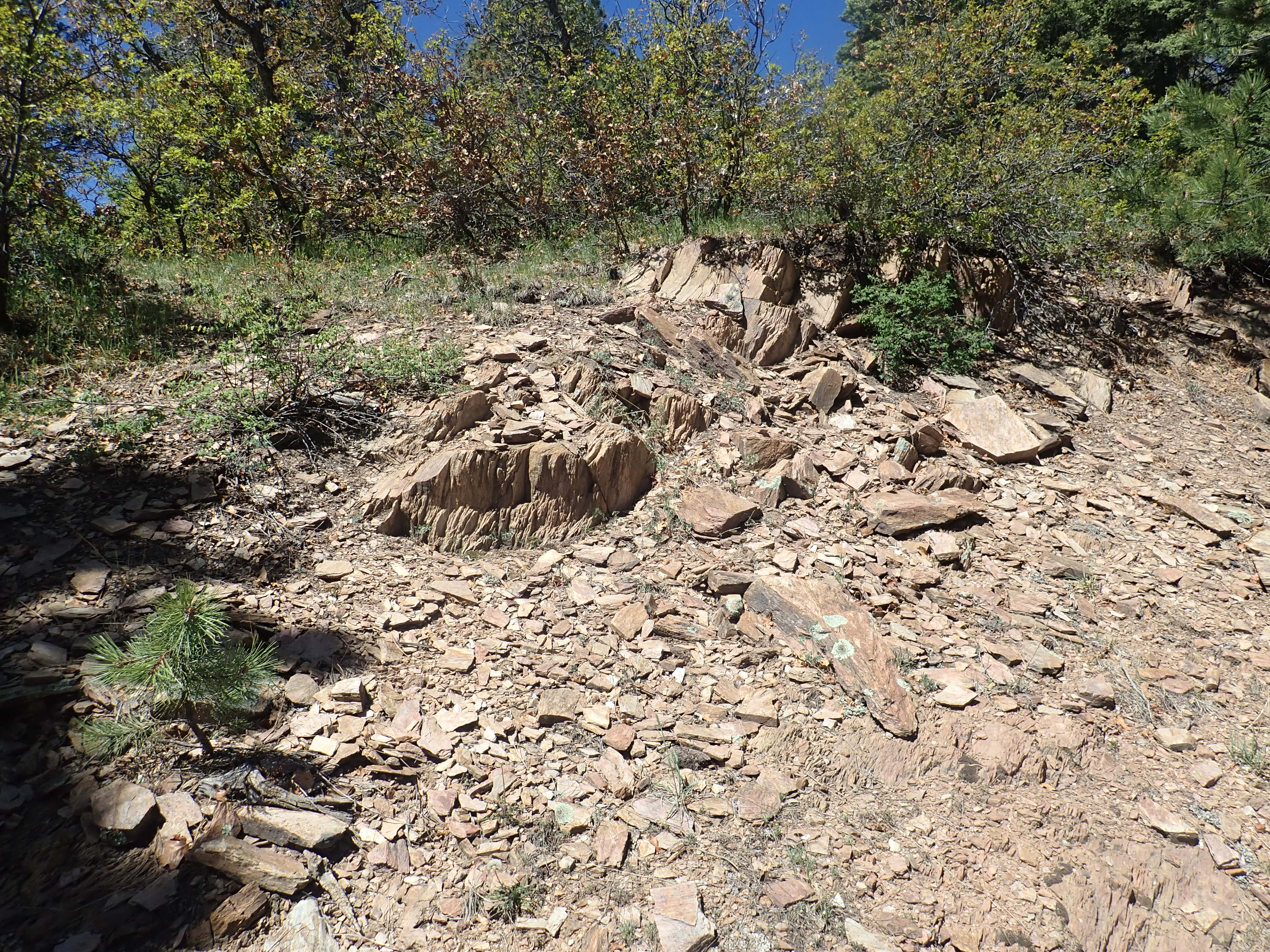
Feldspathic schist of the Moppin Complex on Hopewell Ridge.
