= Marquenas Formation =

Geologic formation in New Mexico, US

- Stratigraphic range: Calymmian
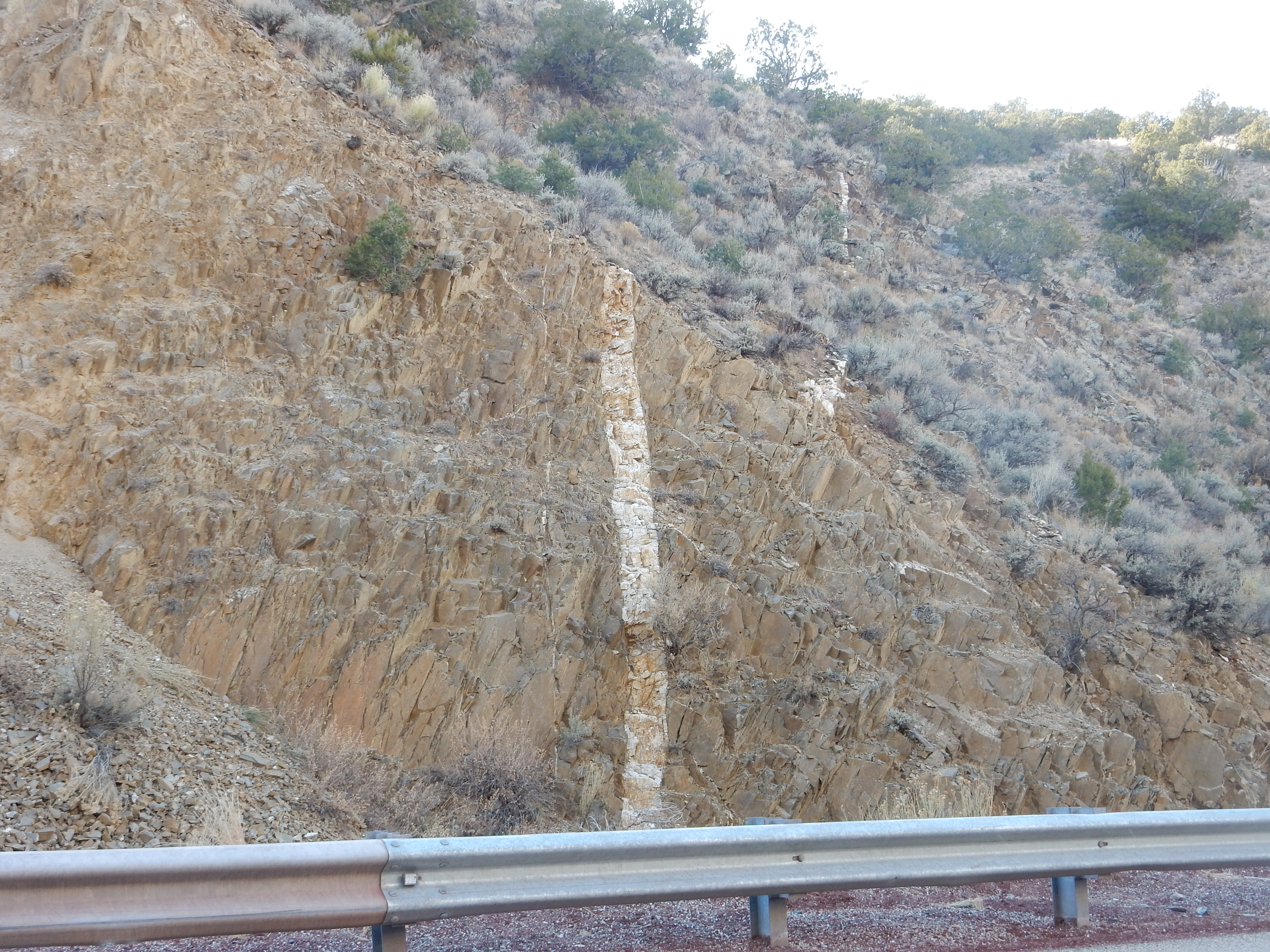
- Marquenas Formation with crosscutting dike, Picuris Mountains
- Type: Formation
- Overlies: Piedra Lumbre Formation
- Thickness: 500 m (1,600 ft)

Lithology
- Primary: Quartzite
- Other: Metaconglomerate

Location
- Coordinates: 36.207°N 105.820°W
- Region: Picuris Mountains, New Mexico
- Country: United States

Type section
- Named for: Cerro de las Marquenas (36.207°N 105.820°W)
- Named by: Long
- Year defined: 1976
- Marquenas Formation (the United States) Marquenas Formation (New Mexico)

The Marquenas Formation is a geological formation that crops out in the Picuris Mountains of northern New Mexico. Detrital zircon geochronology gives it a maximum age of 1435 million years, corresponding to the Calymmian period.

== Description ==
The Marquenas Formation was first believed to be over 80% quartzite, with the rest mostly metaconglomerate. The metaconglomerate lenses are found throughout the formation but particularly towards its top, and it was designated the Marquenas Quartzite. However, Bauer and Williams noted that the unit is about equally divided between quartzite and metaconglomerate, which led them to redesignate it as the Marquenas Formation. It can be divided into a lower, highly strained, poorly sorted boulder conglomerate; a middle quartzite member; and an upper, highly strained, pebble-to-cobble conglomerate.

Cross stratification shows that the layering is overturned, and this supported the interpretation of the formation as part of the Vadito Group, likely correlating with the Big Rock Formation of the Tusas Mountains. However, detrital zircon geochronology establishes a maximum age of 1435 Mya, much younger than the Vadito Group. The provenance of the quartzite clasts in the Marquenas Formation remain uncertain, since they contain no aluminum silicate minerals and little crossbedding, but both are present in the Ortega Formation, the most likely local source rock. One possibility is that the clasts were derived from quartzite units of the Manzano Group to the south.

A metamorphosed tuff bed in the Pilar Formation yields an age of 1488 ± 6 Mya, and the Piedra Lumbre Formation likewise contains zircons dated to 1425 Mya. This suggests that the Pilar Formation and Piedra Lumbre Formation should be removed from the Hondo Group, and grouped with the Marquenas Formation as sediments deposited by the Picuris orogeny.

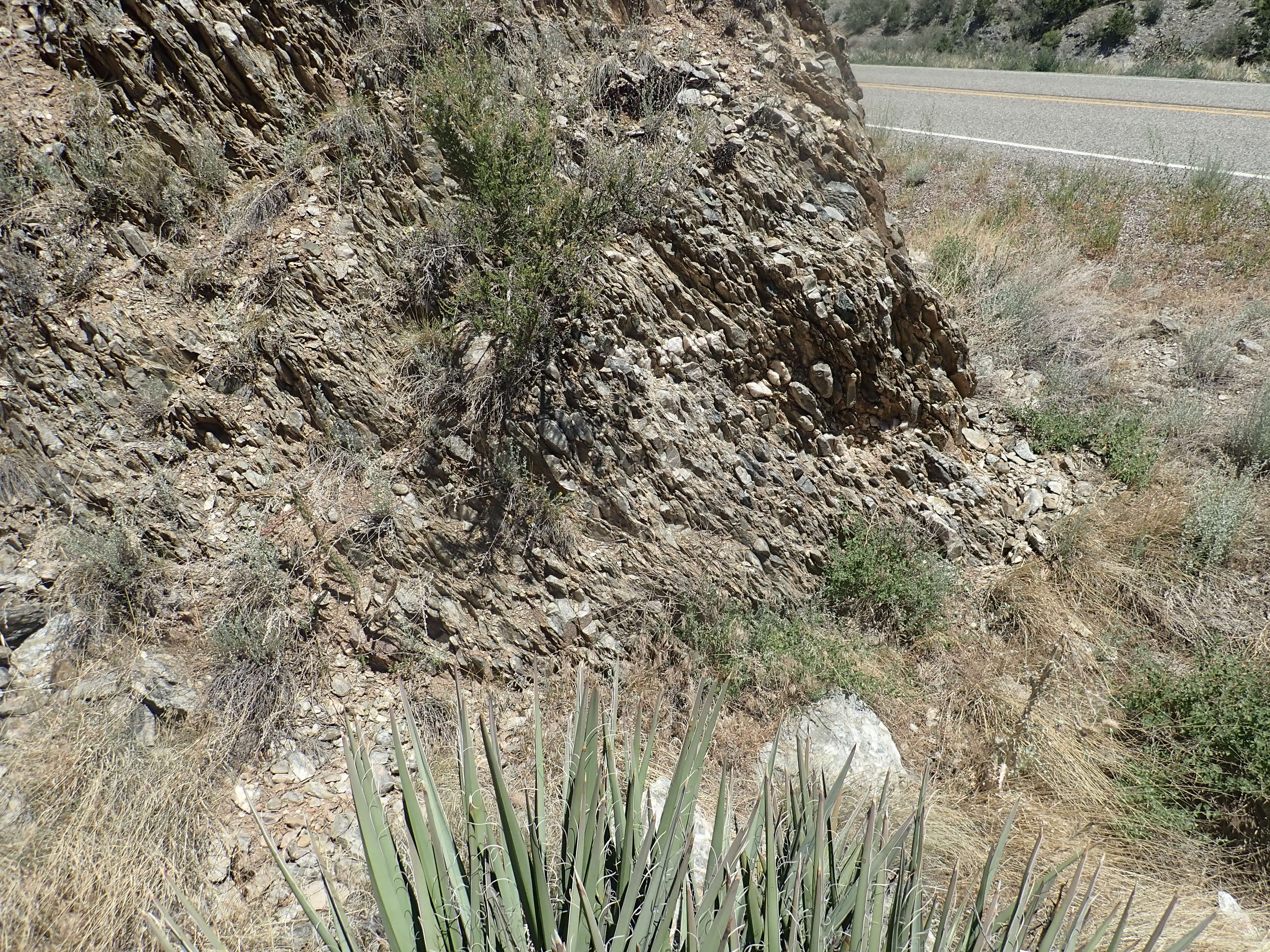
Coarse conglomerate at the base of the Marquenas Formation

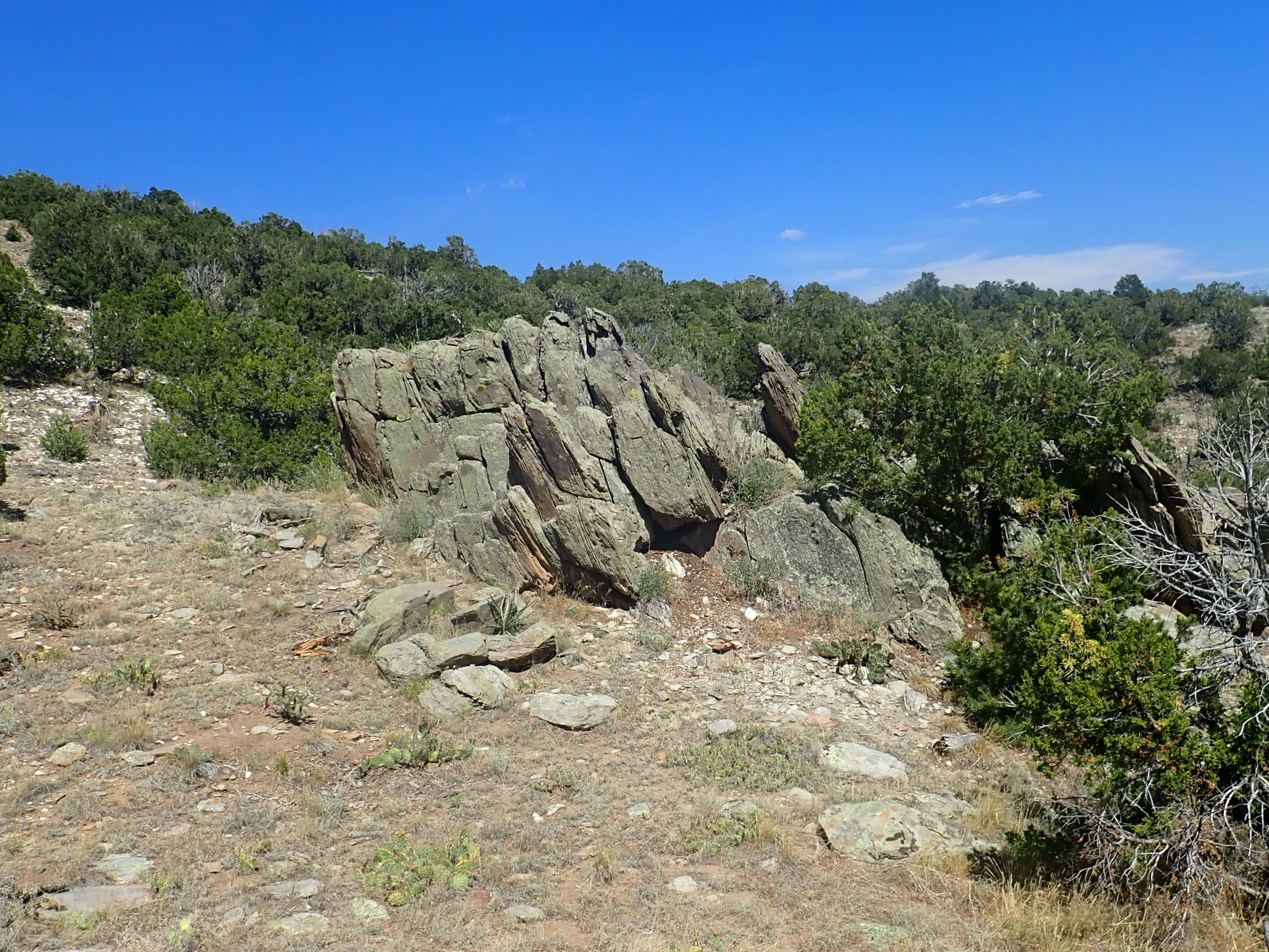
Middle quartzite section of Marquenas Formation

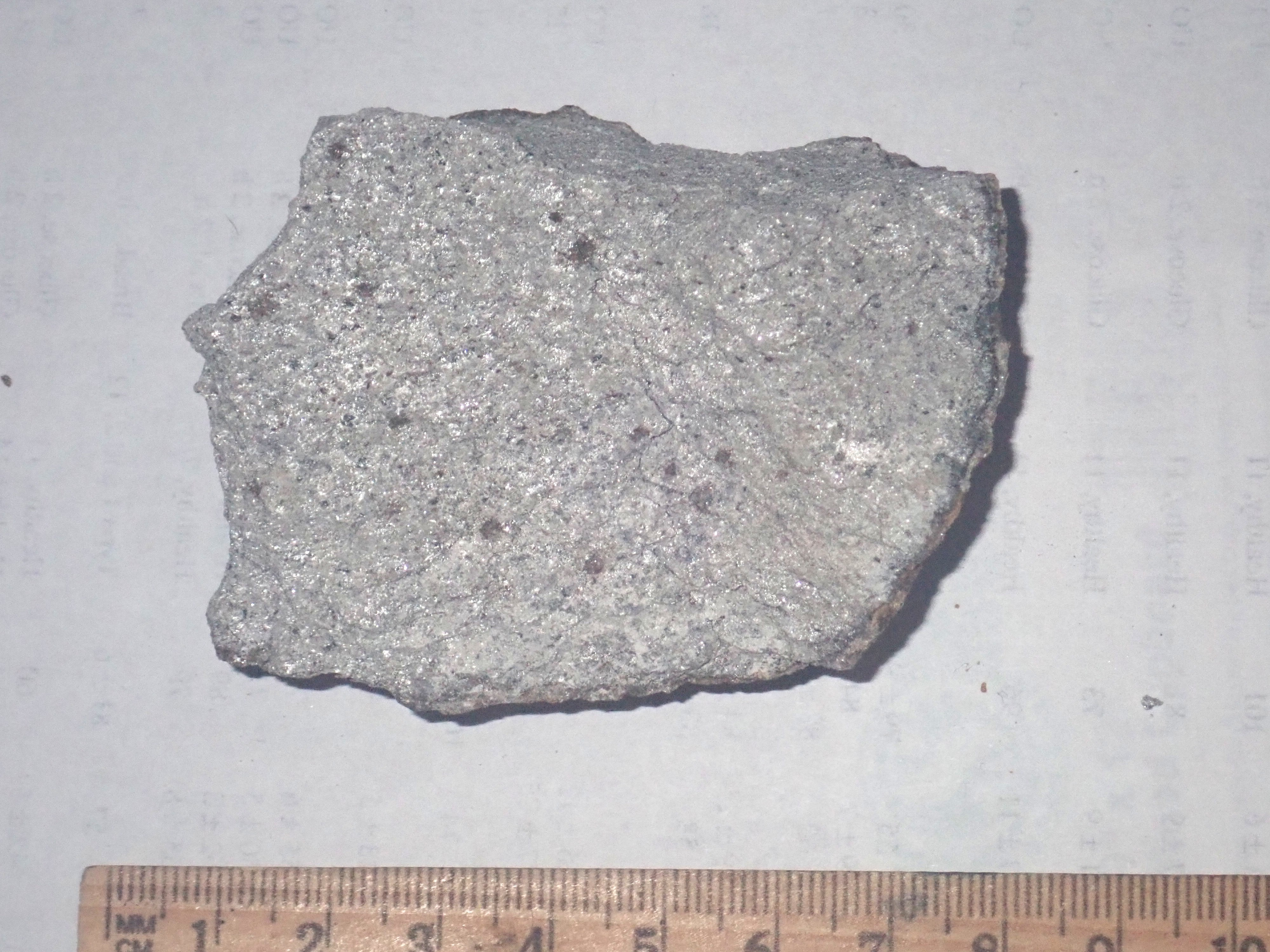
Sample of quartzite from the middle section of the Marquenas Formation

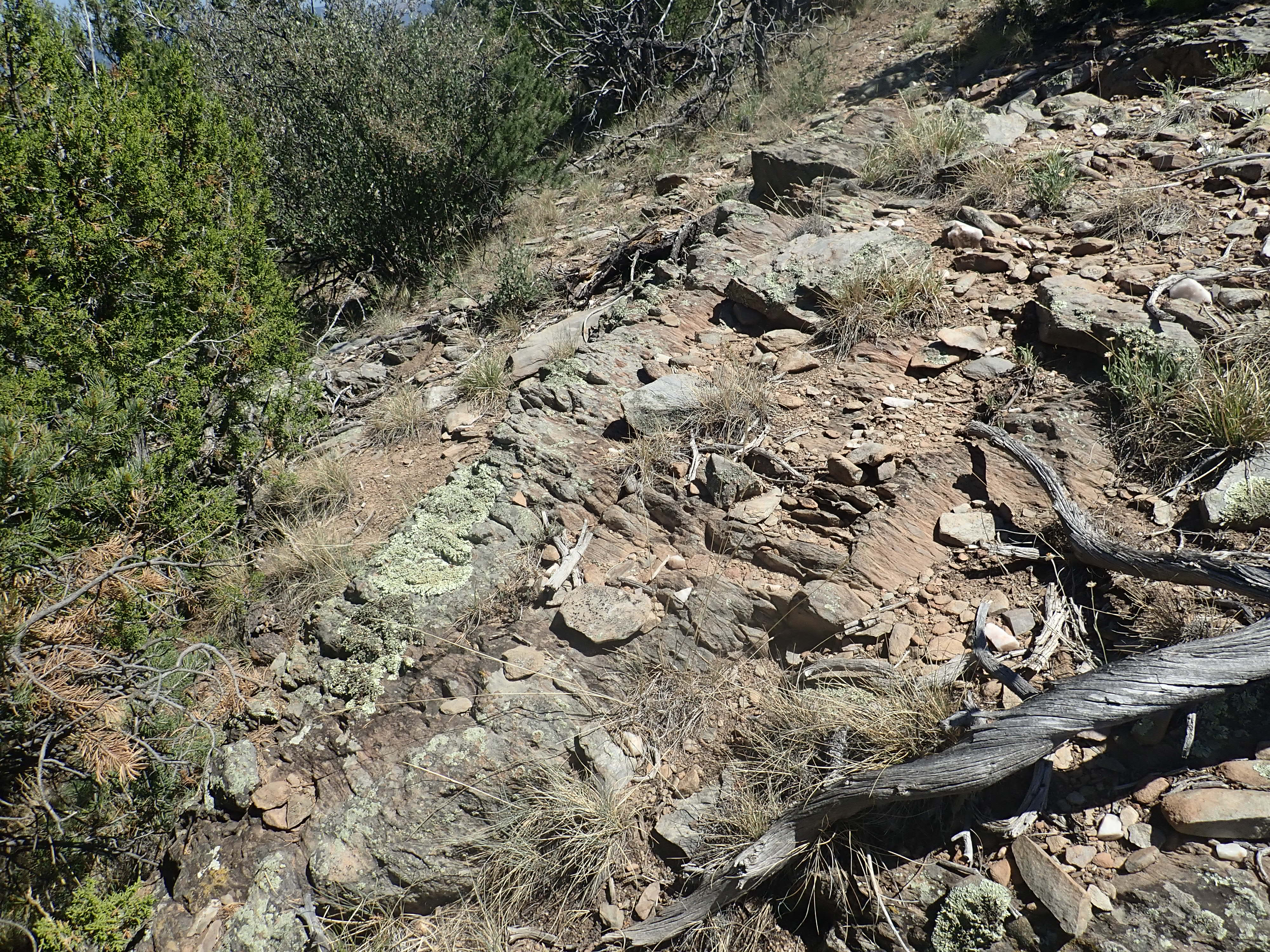
Upper beds of Marquenas Formation

== History of investigation ==
The beds were originally assigned to the lower conglomerate member of the Vadito Formation by Arthur Montgomery in 1953, who estimated the thickness as up to 600 meters. P.E. Long broke the beds out as the Marquenas Quartzite in 1976 and named them after Cerro de las Marquenas. Paul W. Bauer and Michael L. Williams redesignated the unit as the Marquenas Formation in their sweeping revision of the stratigraphy of Precambrian rocks in northern New Mexico in 1989.
