= Vadito Group =

Group of geologic formations in New Mexico, US

- Stratigraphic range: Statherian
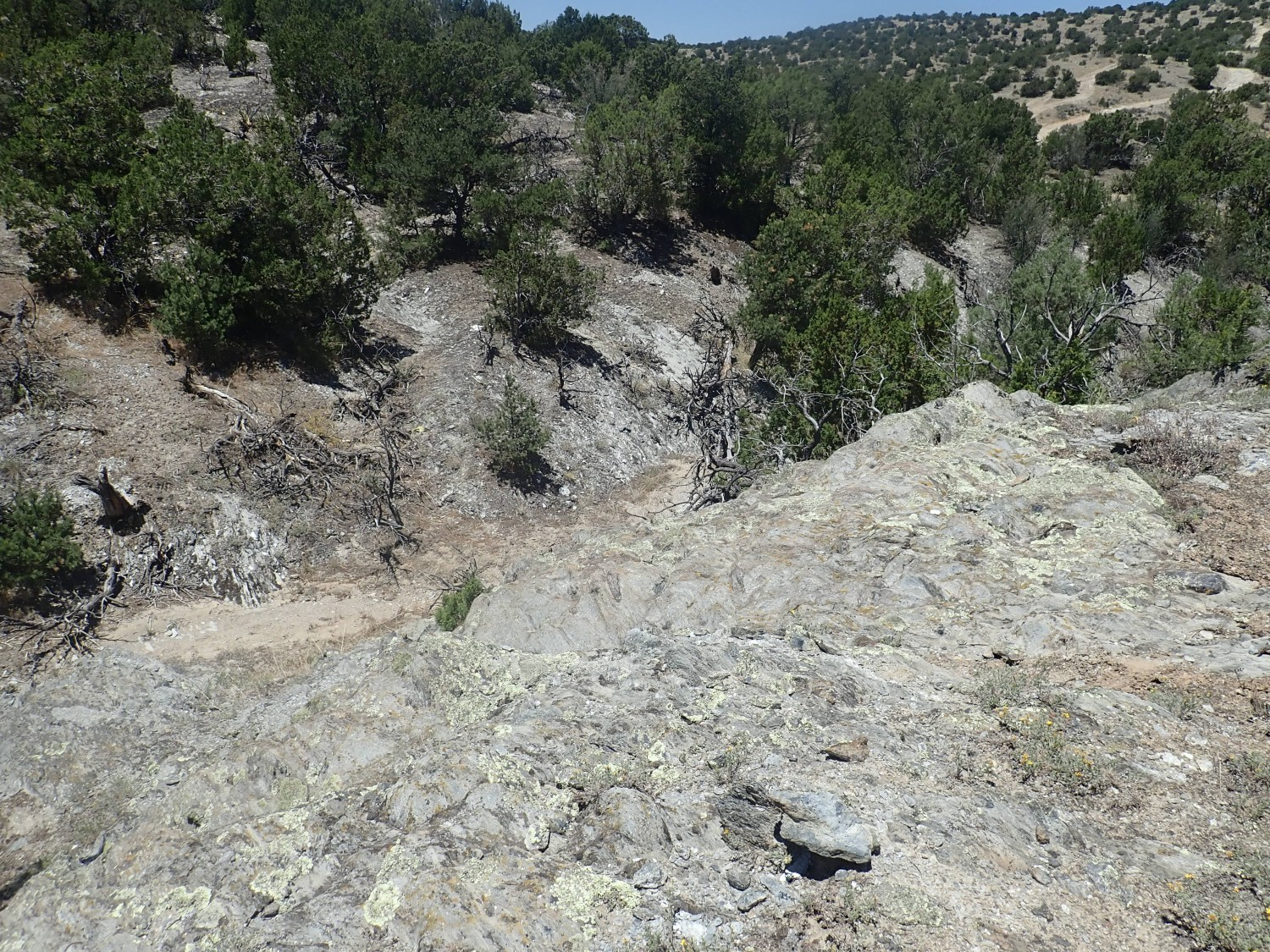
- Vadito Group schists in the Picuris Mountains
- Type: Group
- Sub-units: Big Rock Formation; Burned Mountain Formation; Glenwoody Formation
- Underlies: Hondo Group
- Overlies: Moppin Complex

Lithology
- Primary: Metasedimentary rock
- Other: Metavolcanic rock

Location
- Coordinates: 36.193°N 105.797°W
- Region: Picuris and Tusas Mountains, New Mexico
- Country: United States

Type section
- Named for: Vadito, New Mexico
- Named by: A. Montgomery
- Year defined: 1953
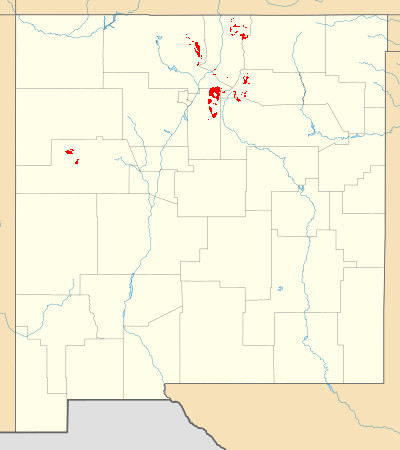
- Vadito Group (New Mexico) Map of Vadito Group outcroppings

The Vadito Group is a group of geologic formations that crops out in most of the Precambrian-cored uplifts of northern New Mexico. Detrital zircon geochronology and radiometric dating give a consistent age of 1700 Mya for the group, corresponding to the Statherian period.

== Description ==
The Vadito Group is an extensive sequence of supracrustal rocks dominated by feldspathic gneisses, feldspathic schists, and metamorphosed sandstones and conglomerates. Its lower section includes amphibolites, though mafic beds make up less than 10% of the unit. It is found in the Picuris Mountains, the Tusas Mountains, the Truchas Range, the Mora River area, the Rincon Mountains (36.0784234°N 105.3502279°W), the northern Taos Range, and in the Cimarron Range. Detrital zircon geochronology establishes that the principal source regions for the sediments that became the Vadito Group had ages of 1765 to 1704 Mya. The absolute age of the Burned Mountain Formation constituting the upper part of the Vadito Group in the Tusas Mountains is 1700 Mya, based on uranium-lead dating.

The Vadito Group is divided into the Big Rock Formation and Burned Mountain Formation in the Tusas Mountains, and the upper Vadito Group is assigned to the Glenwoody Formation in the Picuris Mountains. The Burnt Mountain Formation probably correlates with the Glenwoody Formation while the Big Rock Conglomerate corresponds to a disconformity in the Picuris Mountains. Detrital zircon dating indicates that the Marquenas Formation, formerly assigned to the Vadito Group, has a maximum age of 1435 Mya and is not part of the Vadito Group.

The Vadito Group lies structurally above the Hondo Group in the Picuris Mountains. However, both groups have been severely deformed and metamorphosed, and the Vadito Group is thought to actually be the older of the two groups. Cross-bedding indicates that the Vadito Group has been overturned.

Three metamorphic episodes are recognized in the group. Only the third is well constrained in time, occurring around 1420 Mya and reaching the amphibolite facies. This is likely associated with the Picuris orogeny.

The Vadito Group is interpreted to have been deposited in deep water in a volcanic back-arc basin (the Pilar basin) that opened during the Yavapai orogeny.

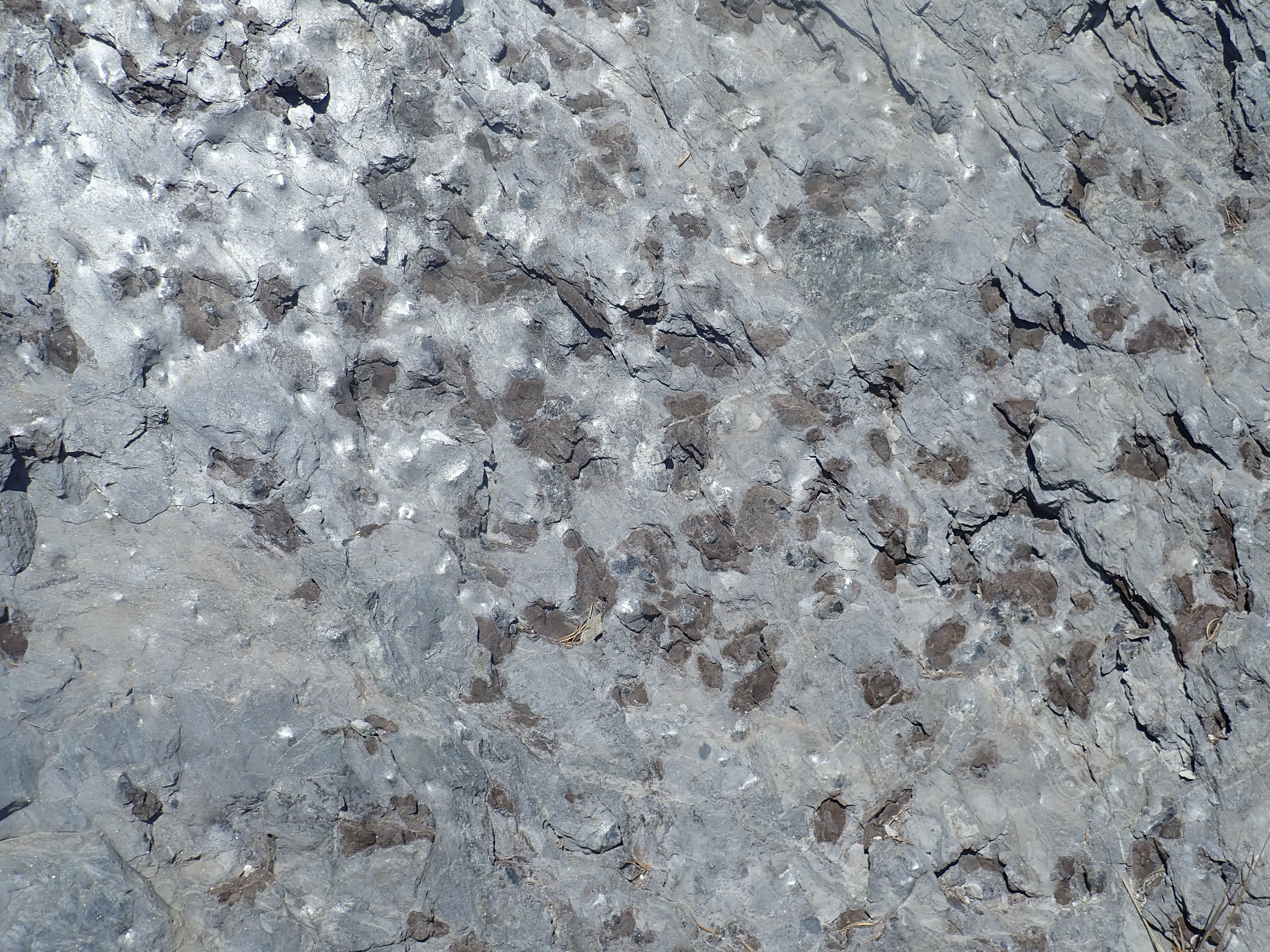
Staurolite replacing andalusite in Vadito Group muscovite schist bed

== Economic geology ==
The Vadito Group is intruded by the pegmatite of the Harding Pegmatite Mine, an historically important source of lithium, beryllium, and tantalum. The Vadito Group has also been mined for kyanite on Mesa La Jara (36.5443°N 106.082°W). Some 1500 tons of kyanite were extracted from Big Rock in 1928, and further prospecting took place in 1948–1949. However, there was no further development of the deposits. The kyanite pods have been interpreted as either metamorphosed pelitic silt lenses, as unusual pegmatites, or as hydrothermal systems.

== History of investigation ==
The unit was designated as the Vadito Formation in 1953 by Arthur Montgomery, who had first taken interest in the geology of the Picuris Mountains as a result of his wartime operation of the Harding Pegmatite Mine. P.E. Long recommended raising it to group rank in 1976 and this was adopted by Bauer and Williams in their sweeping revision of northern New Mexico Precambrian stratigraphy.

== Panorama ==
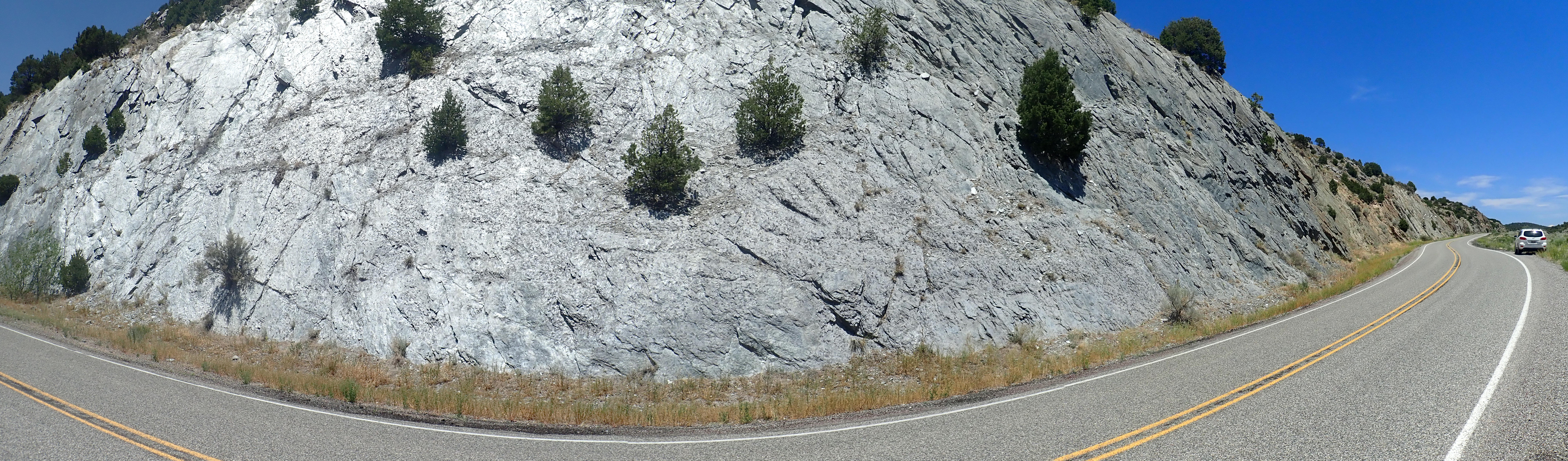
Road cut in Vadito Group muscovite schist. The appearance of a shining metal wall is due to reflection of sunlight off the muscovite, which is layered parallel to the road cut.
