= Maquinita Granodiorite =

Geologic formation in New Mexico, US

- Stratigraphic range: Statherian
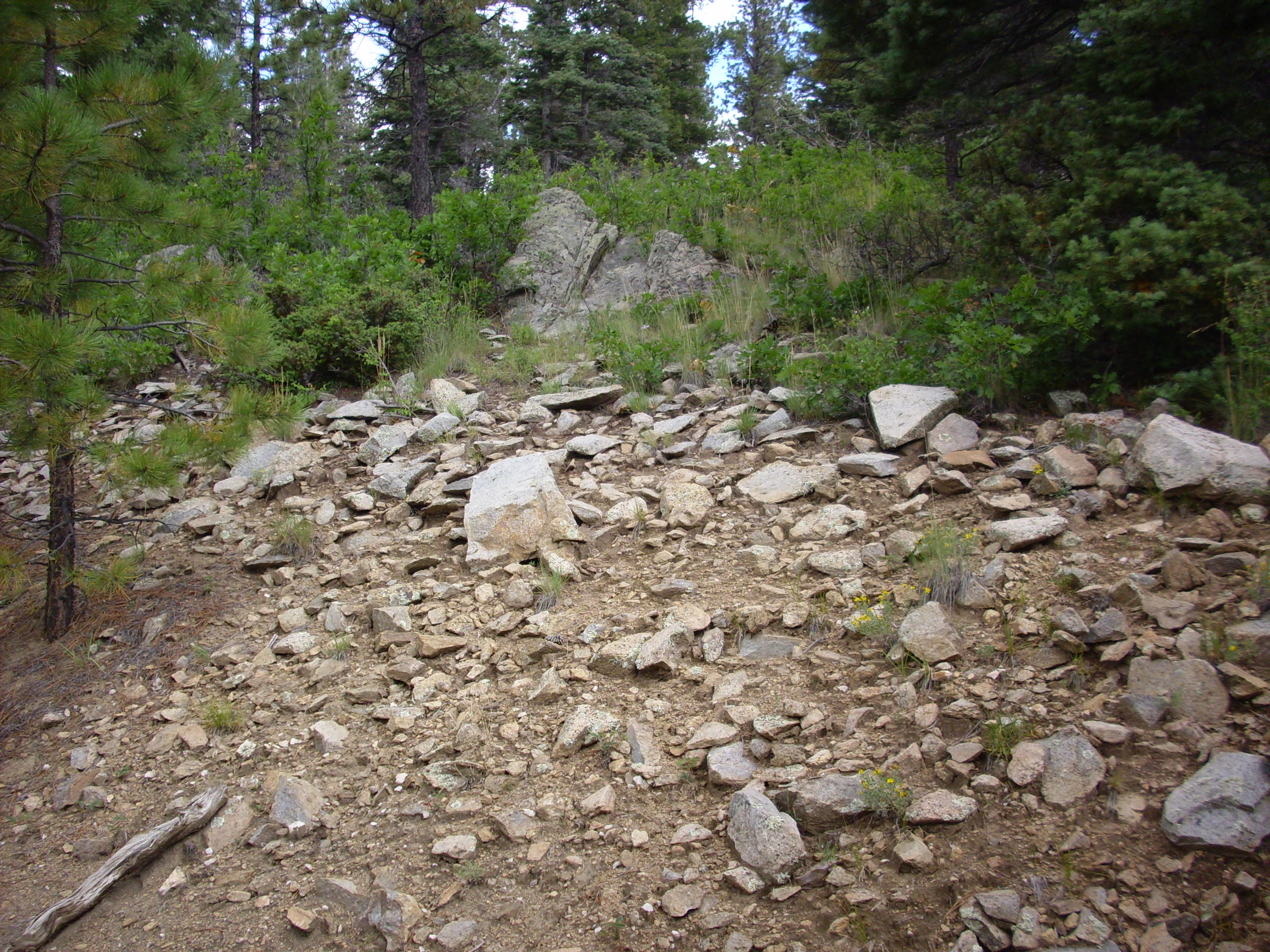
- Maquinitas Grandodiorite on Hopewell Ridge, New Mexico
- Type: Pluton

Lithology
- Primary: Granodiorite

Location
- Coordinates: 36.703°N 106.159°W
- Region: Tusas Mountains, New Mexico
- Country: United States

Type section
- Named for: Maquinita Canyon
- Named by: F. Barker
- Year defined: 1958
- Maquinita Granodiorite (the United States) Maquinita Granodiorite (New Mexico)

The Maquinita Granodiorite is a Precambrian pluton that crops out in the northern Tusas Mountains of New Mexico. It has a radiometric age of 1.755 billion years, corresponding to the Statherian period.

== Overview ==
The formation takes the form of many small dikes and plutons intruding the Moppin Complex. These consist of gray, homogeneous, well-foliated granodiorite. Its modal composition is 57% albite-oligoclase, 27% quartz, 10% biotite, 4% muscovite, and 1% each epidote and microcline. The foliation is defined by biotite knots, up to 2.5 cm in length. The rock appears moderately to strongly sheared. The feldspars have been moderately to thoroughly sericitized and mildly saussuritized. Much of the rock has been sheared to a fine-grained aggregate. The unit contains xenoliths that appear to be Moppin Complex schists.

The fabric (S1) generally strikes 090-110˚ and dips 70 to 90˚ to the south. No folds are visible.

The formation has a uranium-lead radiometric age of 1.755 Gya, which establishes a minimum age for the Moppin Complex it intrudes that is typical of the Yavapai crustal province.

== Economic geology ==
Mineralization veins in the northern Tusas Mountains appear to be coeval with the Maquinita Granodiorite.

== History of investigation ==
Gray granodiorite in the northern Tusas Mountains was mapped by Evan Just in 1937, during his investigations of pegmatites, as part of the Tusas Granite. The current designation was assigned by Fred Bauer during the geological mapping of the Las Tablas area in 1958, who named it for outcrops in Maquinitas Canyon (36.6907°N 106.1747°W)
