= Burned Mountain Formation =

Geologic formation in New Mexico, United States

- Stratigraphic range: Statherian
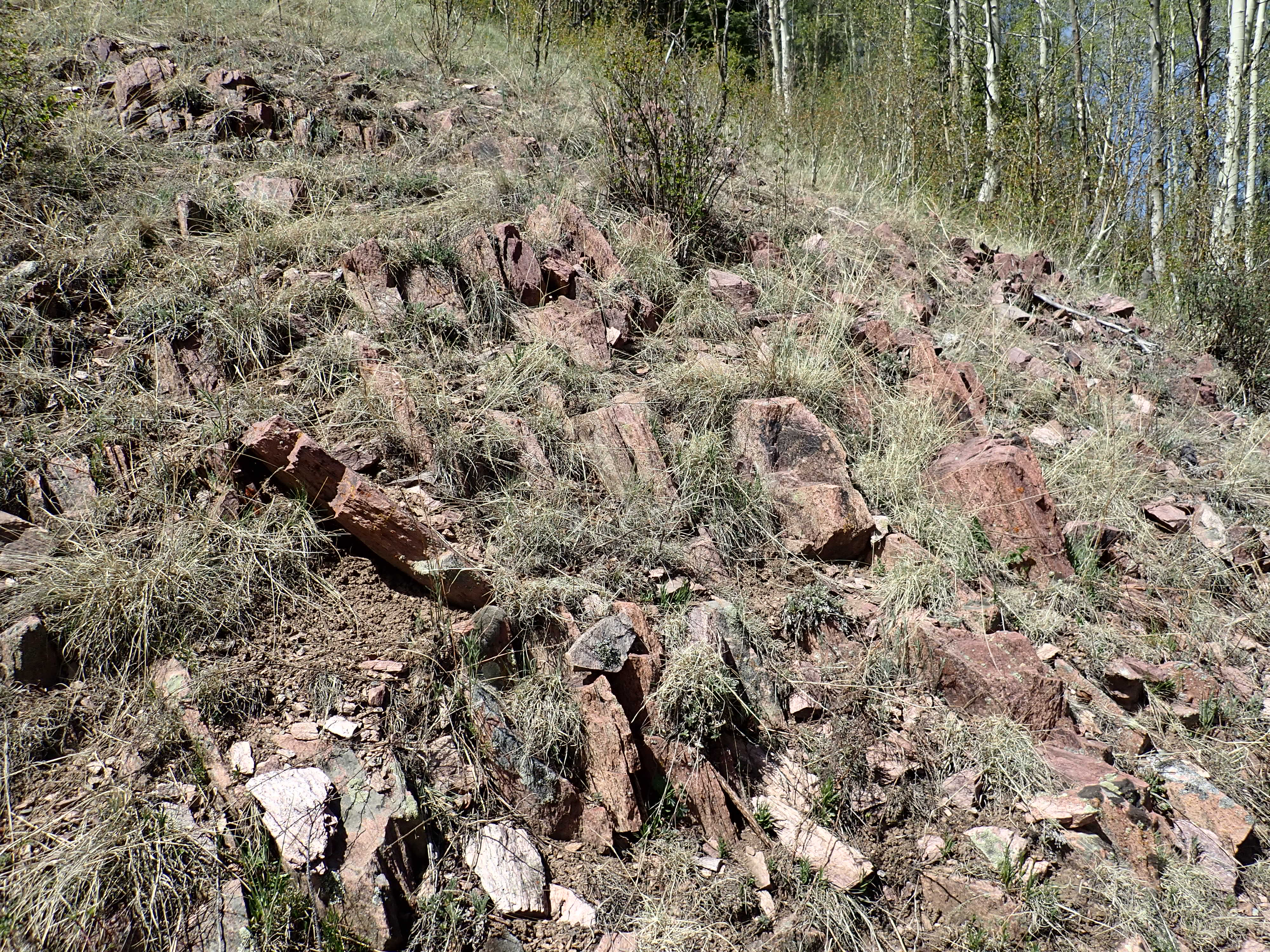
- Burned Mountain Formation exposures near Placer Creek, New Mexico, United States
- Type: Formation
- Unit of: Vadito Group
- Underlies: Hondo Group
- Overlies: Big Rock Formation
- Thickness: 30 m (98 ft)

Lithology
- Primary: Metarhyolite

Location
- Coordinates: 36.6798585°N 106.2255698°W
- Region: Tusas Mountains, New Mexico
- Country: United States

Type section
- Named for: Burned Mountain (36.678°N 106.221°W)
- Named by: F. Barker
- Year defined: 1958
- Burned Mountain Formation (the United States) Burned Mountain Formation (New Mexico)

The Burned Mountain Formation is a geologic formation that crops out in the Tusas Mountains of northern New Mexico. It has a U–Pb radiometric age of 1700 Mya, corresponding to the Statherian period.

== Description ==
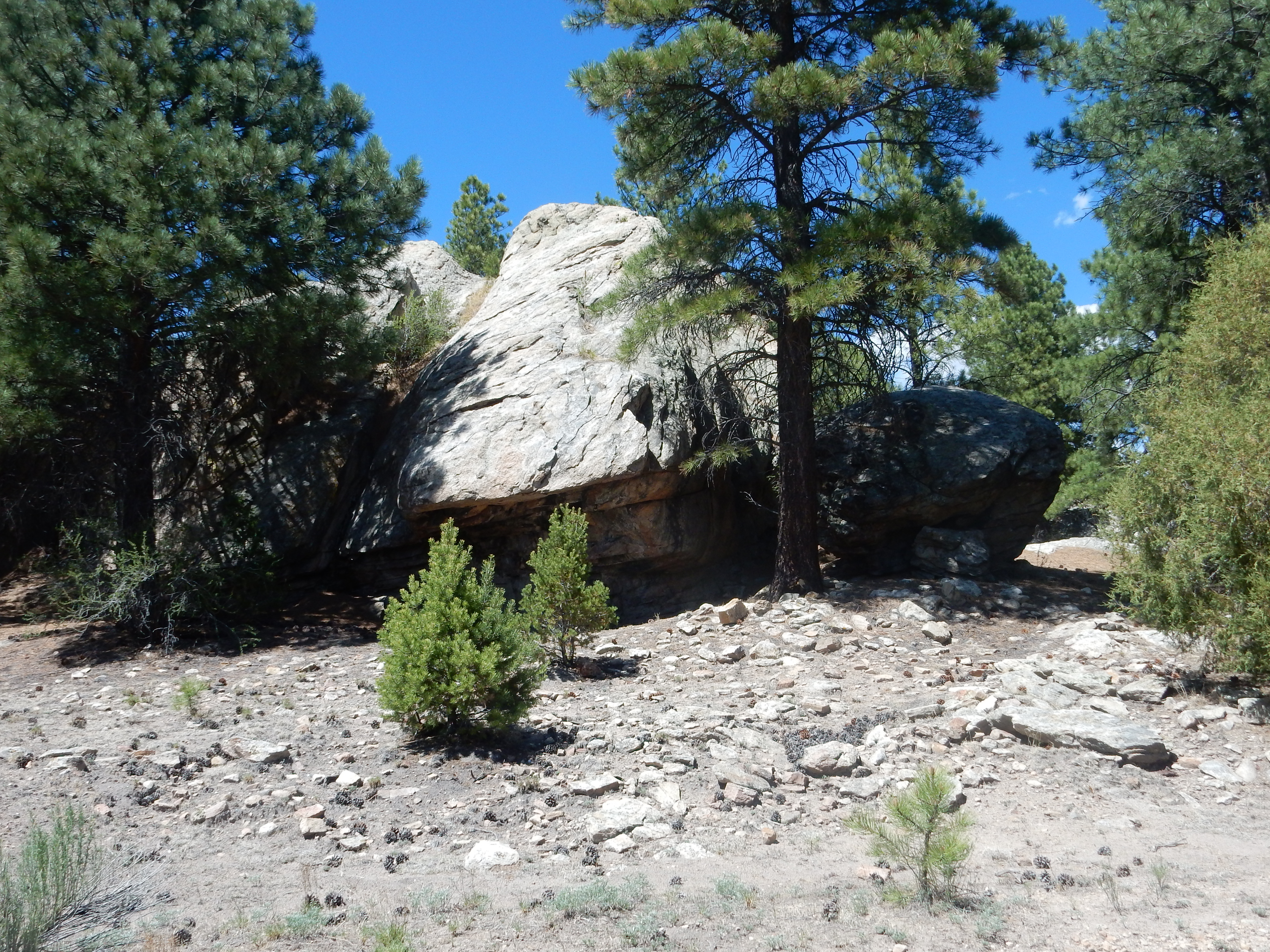
An outcrop of Burned Mountain Formation at Mesa la Jara, previously assigned to the Petaca Schist

The Burned Mountain Formation as originally defined is a metamorphosed rhyolite that appears to have intruded the Moppin Complex, mostly as sills. Portions of the formation are described as quartz-eye schists. The unit was later expanded to include most of the Vadito Group beds found throughout the central Tusas Mountains, representing the upper portion of the Vadito Group in this region and correlating with the Glenwoody Formation in the Picuris Mountains. It is up to 30 meters (98 feet) thick and has a uranium–lead radiometric age of 1700 Mya.

The metarhyolite making up much of the formation is reddish orange in color, but ranges from brick red to light pink. It includes relict phenocrysts of quartz and microcline and most outcrops show drag-folded flow bands. Some outcrops contain relict phenocrysts of albite-oligoclase. All of the phenocrysts have been reoriented about axes parallel to that of the drag-folded flow bands. Phenocryst size is from 0.02 to over 5 mm but typically 0.5 mm and show resorption or recrystallization to aggregates of smaller grains. The ground mass has a mosaic texture of 0.02 mm. Normative composition is 34.9% quartz, 28.9% orthoclase, 28.8% albite, 3.3% hypersthene, 3.2% magnetite, 1.7% anorthite, 1.2% diopside, and 0.8% ilmenite.

The unit is conformable with the surrounding metasedimentary beds, supporting an interpretation that the Burned Mountain Formation beds were originally ash flows. The unit resembles the Tres Piedras Orthogneiss but is slightly older. Several beds of highly muscoviteized Burned Mountain Formation were originally assigned to the Petaca Schist, but this unit name has since been abandoned.

== History of investigation ==
The unit was originally designated as the Vallecitos rhyolite by Evan Just in his study of pegmatites in the Tusas Mountains. but this name was already in use, and it was renamed the Burned Mountain metarhyolite by F. Barker in 1958. It was designated as a formation in the Vadito Group by Bauer and Williams in their sweeping revision of northern New Mexico Precambrian stratigraphy in 1989.
