= Group (stratigraphy) =

Group of geologic formations

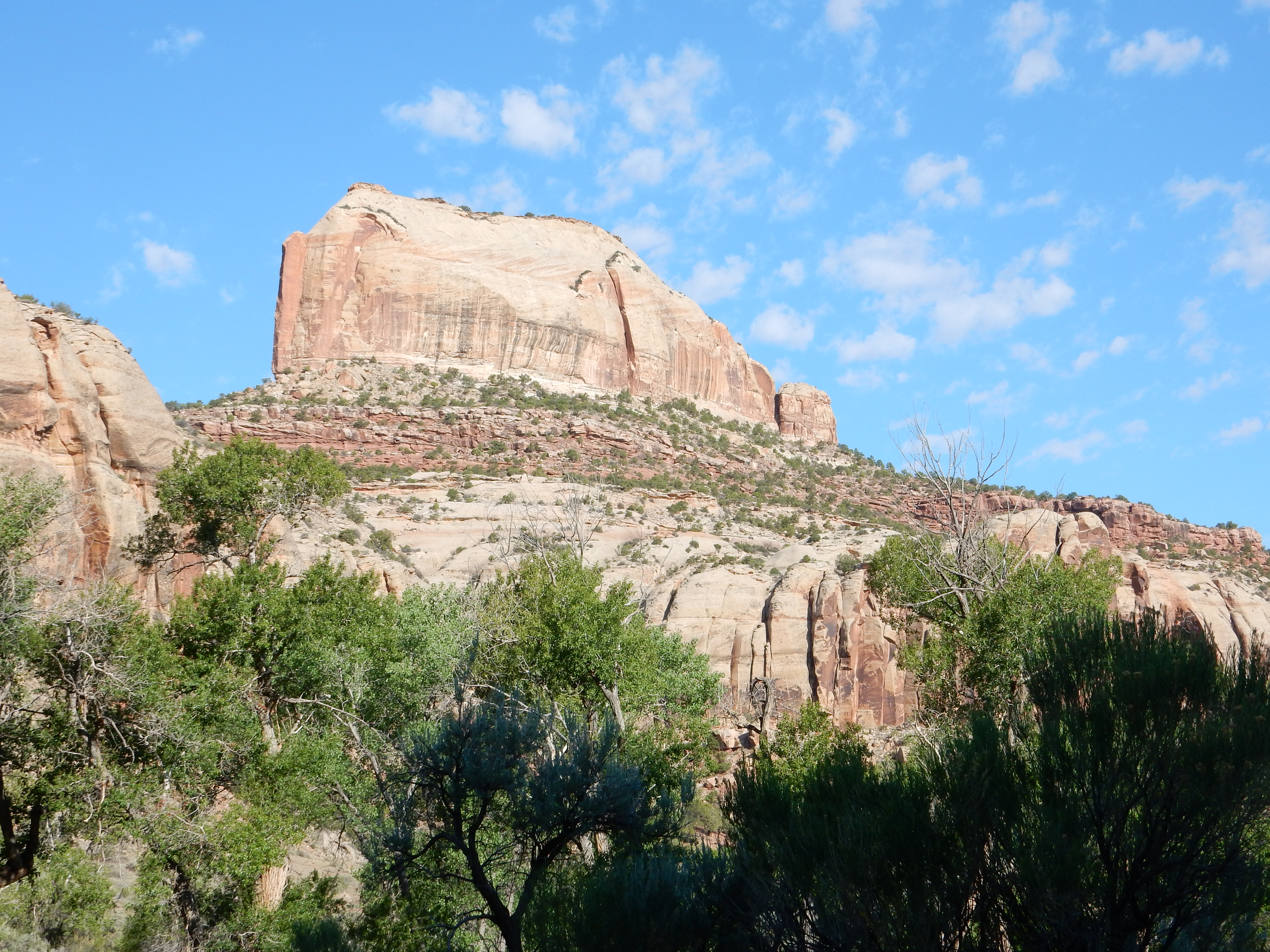
Glen Canyon Group in southeast Utah. At top are massive beds of Navajo Sandstone separated by thinner beds of the Kayenta Formation from massive beds at bottom of the Wingate Sandstone.

In geology, a group is a lithostratigraphic unit consisting of a series of related formations that have been classified together to form a group. Formations are the fundamental unit of stratigraphy. Groups may sometimes be combined into supergroups, and may sometimes be divided into subgroups.

Groups are useful for showing relationships between formations, and they are also useful for small-scale mapping or for studying the stratigraphy of large regions. Geologists exploring a new area have sometimes defined groups when they believe the strata within the groups can be divided into formations during subsequent investigations of the area. It is possible for only some of the strata making up a group to be divided into formations.

An example of a group is the Glen Canyon Group, which includes (in ascending order) the Wingate Sandstone, the Moenave Formation, the Kayenta Formation, and the Navajo Sandstone. Each of the formations can be distinguished from its neighbor by its lithology, but all were deposited in the same vast erg. Not all these formations are present in all areas where the Glen Canyon Group is present.

Another example of a group is the Vadito Group of northern New Mexico. Although many of its strata have been divided into formations, such as the Glenwoody Formation, other strata (particularly in the lower part of the group) remain undivided into formations.

Some well known groups of northwestern Europe have in the past also been used as units for chronostratigraphy and geochronology. These are the Rotliegend and Zechstein (both of Permian age); Buntsandstein, Muschelkalk, and Keuper (Triassic in age); Lias, Dogger, and Malm (Jurassic in age) groups. Because of the confusion this causes, the official geologic timescale of the ICS does not contain any of these names. As with other lithostratigraphic ranks, a group must not be defined by fossil taxonomy.
