= Glenwoody Formation =

- Stratigraphic range: Statherian
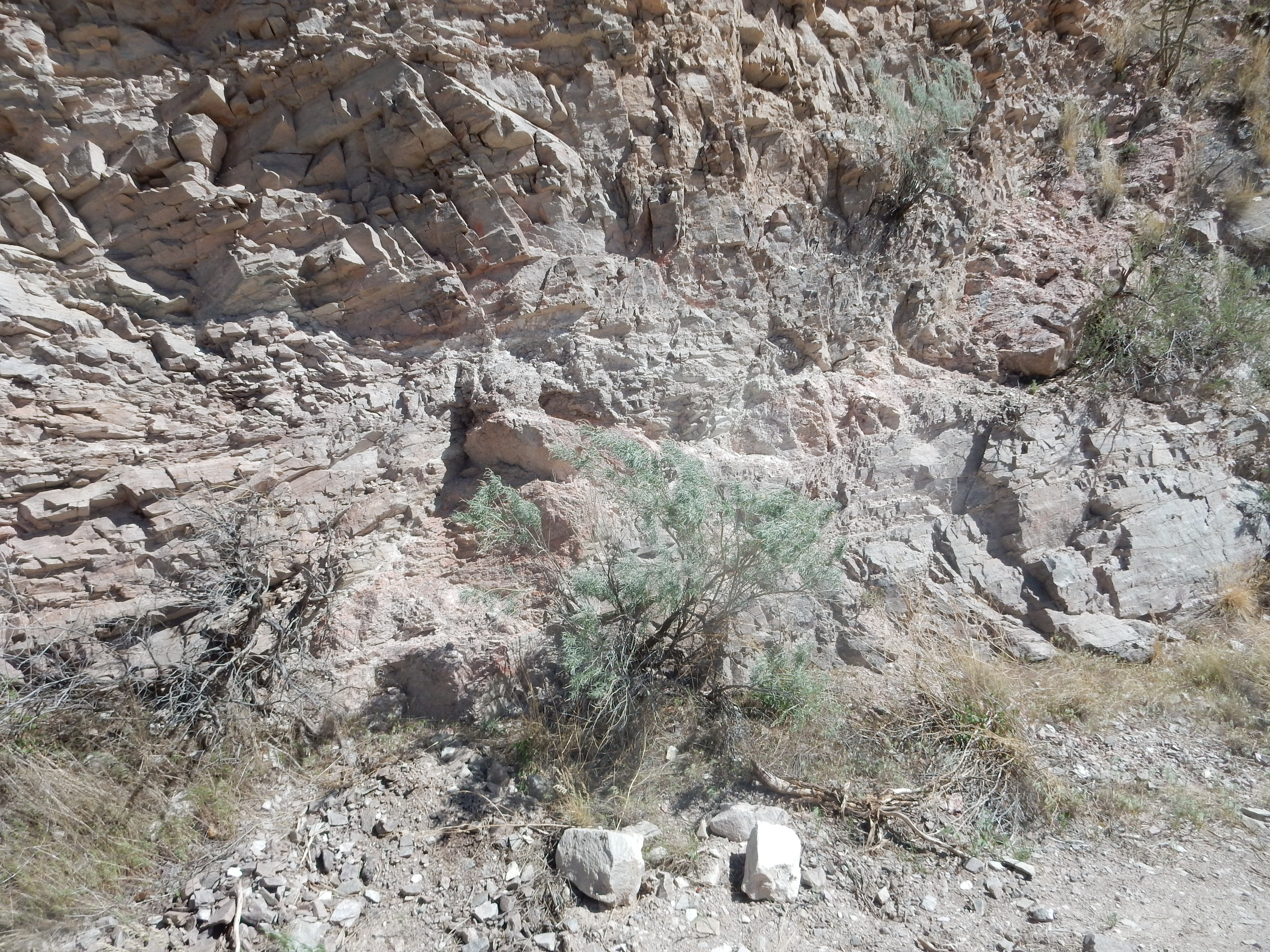
- Quartzite of the Glenwoody Formation at the base of the Pilar Cliffs, New Mexico, United States
- Type: Formation
- Unit of: Vadito Group
- Underlies: Hondo Group
- Overlies: lower Vadito Group
- Thickness: 300 m (980 ft)

Lithology
- Primary: Quartz–muscovite schist
- Other: Quartzite

Location
- Coordinates: 36.2659°N 105.7956°W
- Region: Picuris Mountains, New Mexico
- Country: United States

Type section
- Named for: Glenwoody mining camp
- Named by: Bauer and Williams
- Year defined: 1989
- Glenwoody Formation (the United States) Glenwoody Formation (New Mexico)

The Glenwoody Formation is a geological formation that is exposed in the cliffs southeast of the Rio Grande Gorge near the town of Pilar and in a few other locations in the Picuris Mountains. Its minimum age from detrital zircon geochronology is 1.693 Mya, corresponding to the Statherian period.

== Description ==
The formation is composed of homogeneous feldspathic quartz-muscovite or quartz-eye schist containing quartz and feldspar megacrysts. Beds are typically light in color, ranging from pink to white to green. The modal composition is 50-70% quartz and 25-50% muscovite. It is notable for tourmaline-rich zones containing accessory fuchsite, purple muscovite, epidote, clinozoisite, zoisite, thulite, tremolite, sillimanite, kyanite, cyprine, allanite, and stibiotantalite. It shows indications of high simple shearing strain. It is at least 300 m (980 ft) in thickness.

The formation is thought to be separated from the underlying lower Vadito Group by a significant unconformity. It is overlain by the Ortega Formation.

Based on Uranium–lead dating of zircons, the age of the formation is 1.693 Mya, and it is interpreted as metamorphosed rhyolites from the waning stage of back arc rifting associated with the Yavapai orogeny. It likely correlates with the Burned Mountain Formation in the Tusas Mountains.

=== Manganese zone ===
The formation has a characteristic manganese-rich zone 30 meters thick near its upper contact with the Hondo Group that characterizes the uppermost Vadito Group throughout the region. It may have formed by syngenetic deposition from hydrothermal fluids, or a more general manganese enrichment of basin waters at the close of Vadito volcanism. Another possibility is that it is a weathering horizon. Either possibility would make it an important regional time marker.

== History of investigation ==
The unit was included in the Ortega Quartzite by Arthur Montgomery in his study of the stratigraphy of the Picuris Mountains, but it is metavolcanic rather than metasedimentary and so was redesignated the Glenwoody Formation of the Vadito Group by Bauer and Williams in their sweeping revision of the stratigraphy of northern New Mexico. The name refers to an old mining camp in the vicinity.
