= Harding Pegmatite Mine =

Adit mine in New Mexico, US

Harding Mine
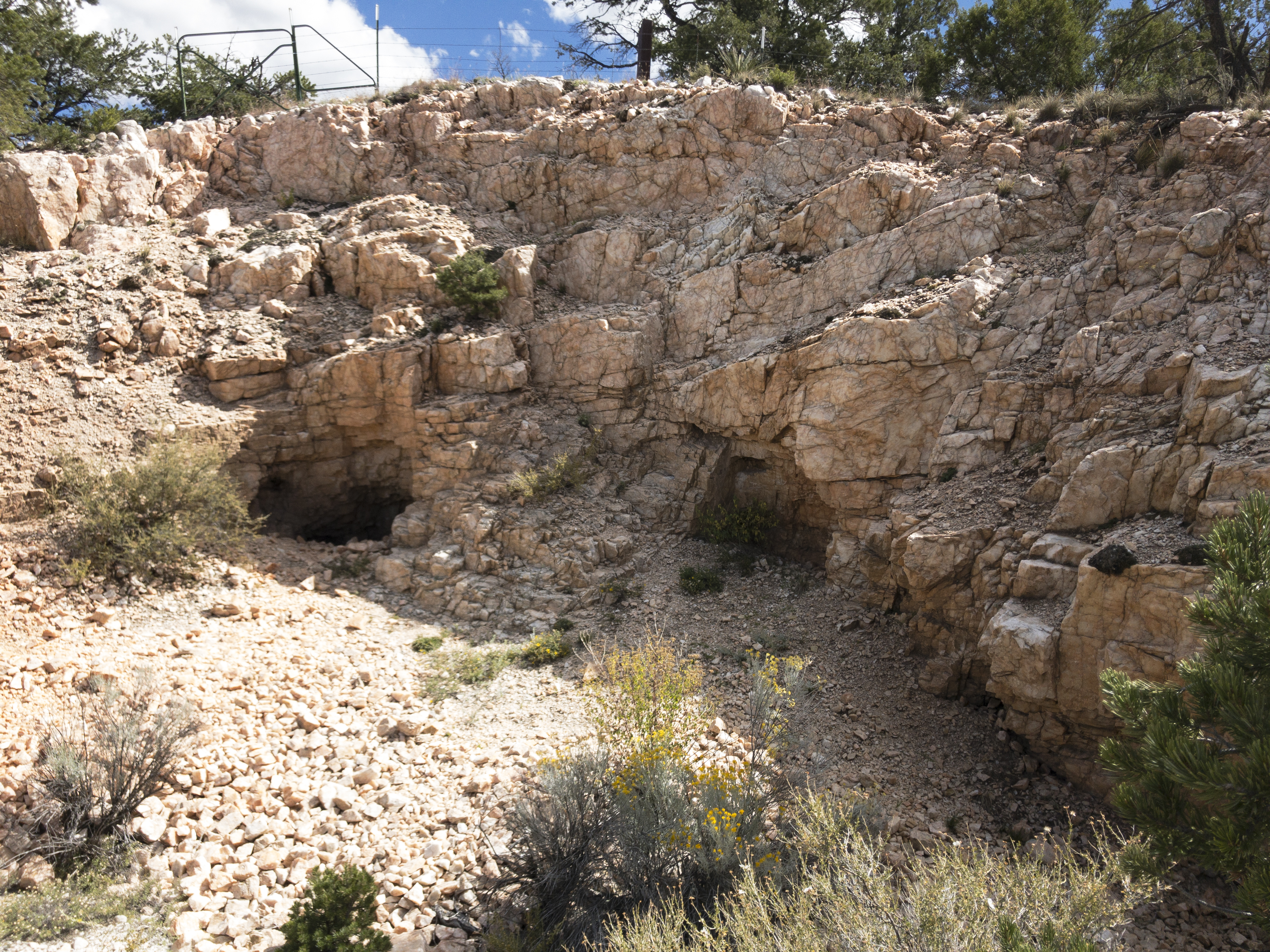
- The Harding Pegmatite Mine is a former beryl quarry in New Mexico.

- Location within New Mexico
- Location: Picuris Mountains, New Mexico, United States; 36°11′34″N 105°47′41″W
- Products: Beryl, lithium, tantalum
- Type: Adit mine
- Discovered: 1918; 108 years ago
- Opened: 1906; 120 years ago
- Closed: 1958; 68 years ago
- Company: University of New Mexico
- Acquired: 1979; 47 years ago

The Harding Pegmatite Mine is a former adit mine that extracted lithium, tantalum, and beryllium from a Precambrian pegmatite sill. It ceased operations in 1958 and its owner, Arthur Montgomery, donated it to the University of New Mexico, which runs the site as an outdoor geology laboratory with mineral collecting permitted on a small scale.

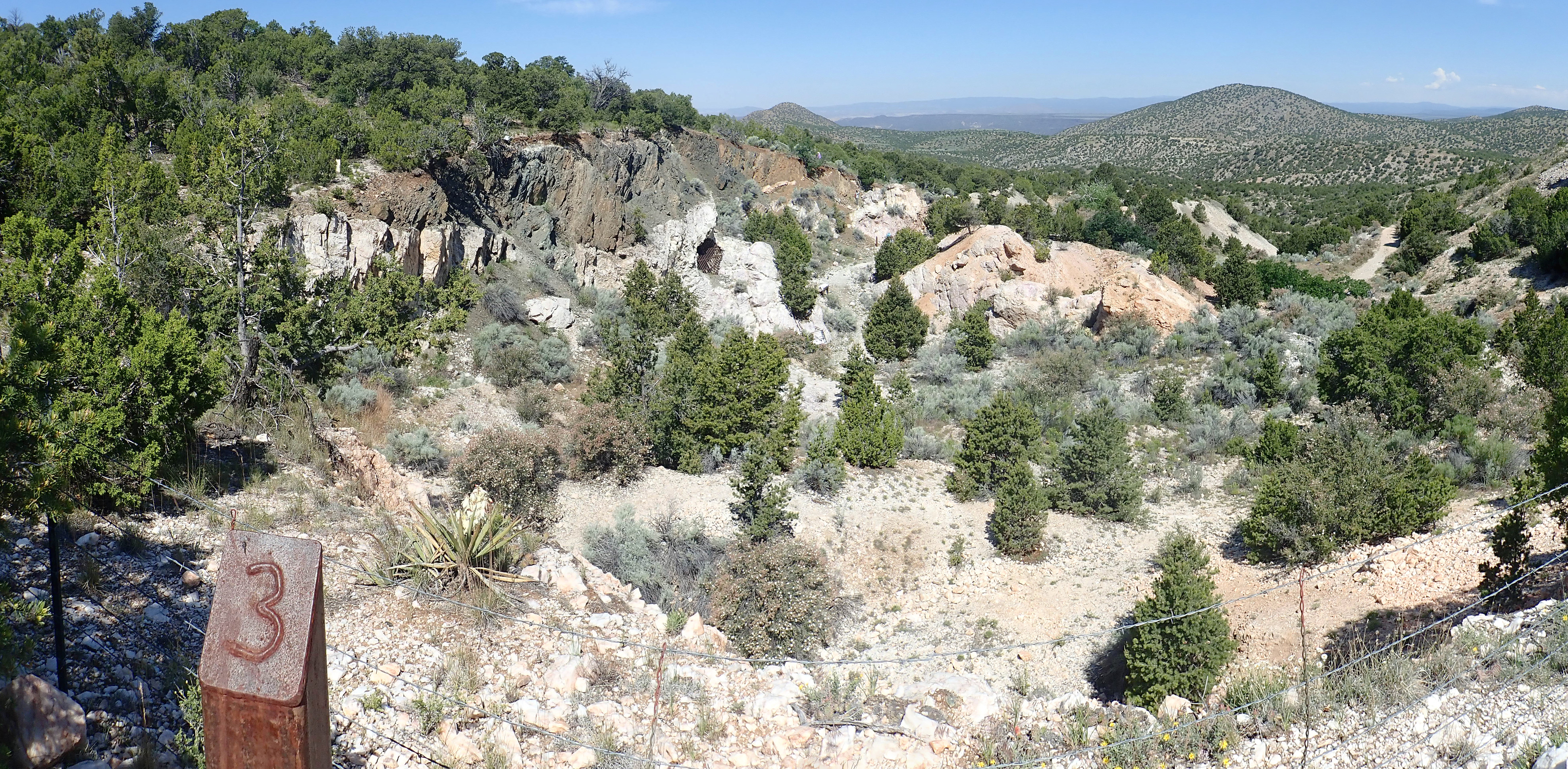
Main quarry of Harding Pegmatite Mine

== History ==
Although the quartz pegmatite had attracted the attention of prospectors since before 1900, the extensive deposits of lepidolite were not recognized until 1918 by Joseph J. Peyer. Peyer and his partners mined the ore body with explosives, sorted the ore by hand, and hauled the ore to Embudo by wagon, where the nearest rail line was located. At that time, the chief use of lithium was in specialty glass. However, the ore was contaminated with unrecognized tantalite which caused serious difficulties with its use, and production ceased in 1924.

That same year, the Embudo Mining Company was organized by J.L. Danziger and began construction of a mill near Embudo. This was completed and mining resumed in 1927. The main ore body was mined out in 1929 and the mine closed again in 1930. About 3,500 tons of ore were produced with a value of about $140,000. This represented a modest profit over the three years of mill operations but a net loss for the entire period of mining.

High demand for tantalum in 1942 for wartime production, and reports going back to 1931 of microlite at the Harding Mine, led Arthur Montgomery to investigate the old workings. He found considerable rich material in the mine dumps and at the east end of the workings, and he obtained a lease purchase contract on the mine property. With a team of six local miners, ore was extracted with chisels and sorted by hand. Concentration of the small but rich quantity of highly valuable ore was problematic, but the U.S. Bureau of Mines Testing Laboratory in Rolla, Missouri, used an experimental gravity separation method to process 33.5 tons of ore and extracted 6137 pounds of 77.55% niobium-tantalum oxide. This was the largest unit of U.S. tantalum production ever recorded. However, a small mill built at Rinconada failed to meet its rated capacity of 12 tons per day.

Lithium ores were also mined during this period, and by the time mining paused in 1947, the mine had yielded 41 tons of high-grade spodumene, 558 tons of lepidolite ore, nearly 500 pounds of placer tantalite-columbite containing an average of 43% tantalum oxide, and 22,116 pounds of microlite concentrates containing an average of 68% tantalum oxide and 7% niobium oxide. The operations were profitable enough to allow Montgomery to purchase the property outright.

During 1943, the U.S. Bureau of Mines drilled 39 exploratory cores south of the main workings. The cores showed enough content of spodumene and tantalum-niobium minerals to be classified as milling-grade ore. This made the Harding the first U.S. pegmatite mine to have blocked-out reserves. These are still in place and could conceivably be mined in the future.

Beryl had been recognized as a minor accessory mineral at the mine from its inception. However, this was so easily confused with the abundant albite and quartz of the pegmatite that it was not until 1942 that the U.S. Geological Survey recognized that beryl was abundant at the mine. In 1944 Montgomery found a single block of beryl weighing almost 100 pounds at one of the dumps, then uncovered a lens of beryl at the west end of the workings. This produced 23 tons of ore containing 11% beryllium oxide. However, full-scale beryllium mining did not begin until 1950. Ore production reached a ton per day, in spite of the difficulties of hand sorting the beryl from the nearly indistinguishable feldspar and quartz gangue.

In 1950 and 1951, beryl production exceeded 150 tons, making New Mexico the leading beryl-producing state. Production averaged 100 tons per year until 1950, when the death of Montgomery's partner, Flaudio Griego, ended mining operations. Operations were simple, using a crew of four men to mine and hand sort the ore, which was taken out on "Beryl", the mine's mule. Production totaled 690 tons of high-grade ore with 11.2% beryllium oxide and 184 tons of lower-grade ore with 5.5% beryllium oxide, as well as small production of lepidolite.

== Geology ==
The Harding pegmatite intrudes along the boundary between the amphibolite and schist facies of the Vadito Group. The various outcroppings form a belt about 2500 feet long and 150 to 500 feet wide. Radiometric ages are somewhat discordant, ranging from 1260 Mya for four Harding muscovites to 1350 Mya for a Harding lepidolite. A more recent "average age" is given as 1336 Mya, and discrepancies may be due to contamination from the host rock. However, the pegmatite is thought to be up to 100 million years younger than any nearby granite plutons and does not seem to be genetically associated with any of them.

The main mine workings are exposed over a length of about 1100 feet and a breadth of up to 250 feet. The pegmatite is zoned subhorizontally into the following zones:

- At the upper contact with the Vadito amphibolite facies: A white border rind, 1 to 2 inches thick, of fine-grained quartz-albite muscovite pegmatite.
- A continuous layer, typically 1 to 5 feet thick but up to 14 feet thick, of very coarse quartz, albite, and muscovite. This zone also contains microcline, and has abundant accessory apatite, beryl, and tantalite. Beryl is occasionally very coarse and abundant.
- A continuous layer of massive quartz, typically 2 to 8 feet in thickness, but up to 20 to 35 feet. This zone is also rich in muscovite, microcline, and cleavelandite.

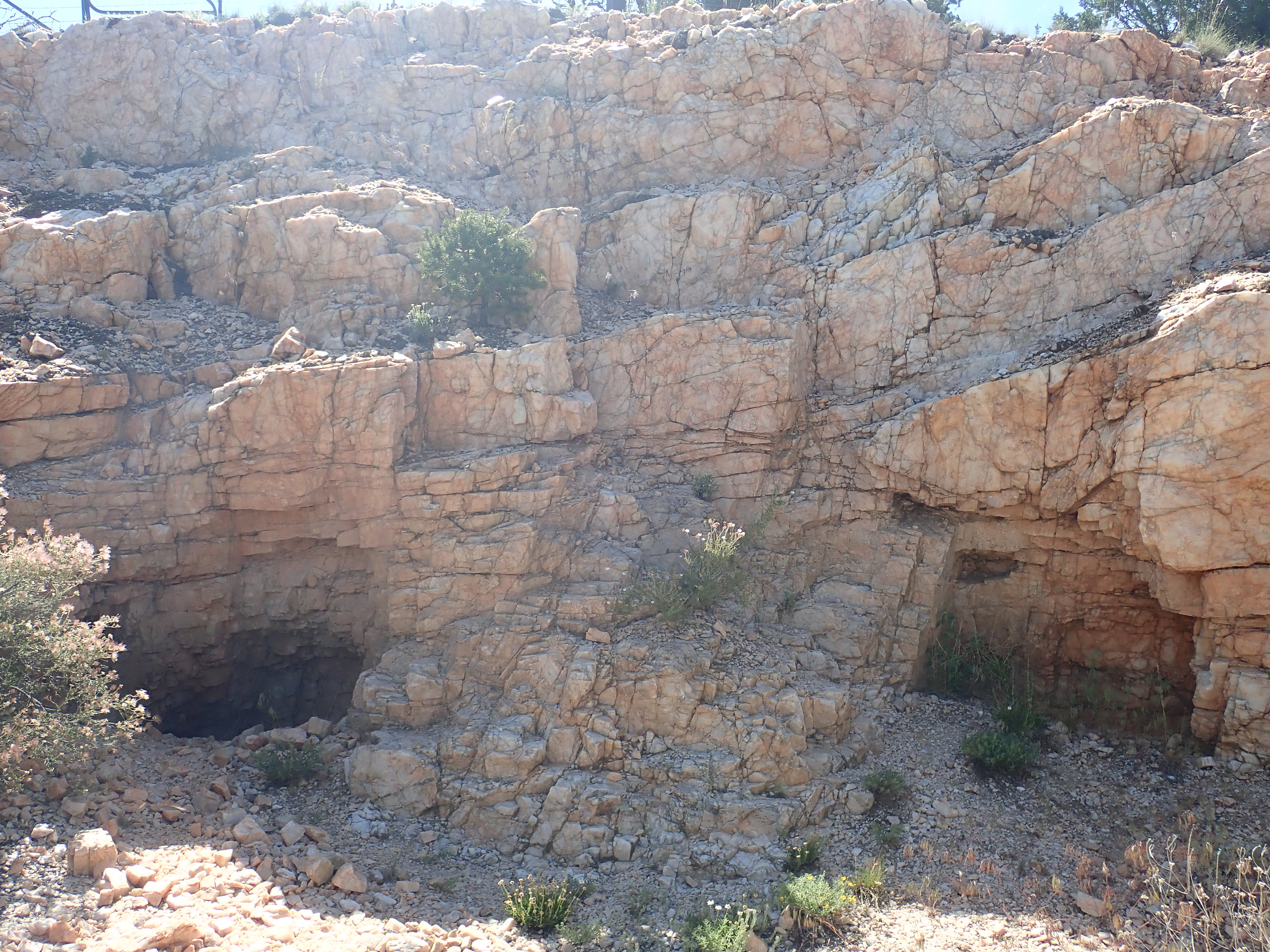
Massive quartz zone of the Harding Mine showing adits

- A spectacular quartz and lath-spodumene zone. This zone is typically 6 to 20 feet thick but locally fills the entire interior of the dike to a thickness of 20 to 40 feet. The spodumene occurs as blade-like crystals, sometimes of enormous size, mostly oriented at random but sometimes arranged to form a comb-like structure. Accessory minerals are beryl, apatite, microcline, and tantalum-niobium minerals, especially in the lower part of this zone. There is some pseudomorphic replacement of spodumene by rose muscovite and quartz by cleavelandite.

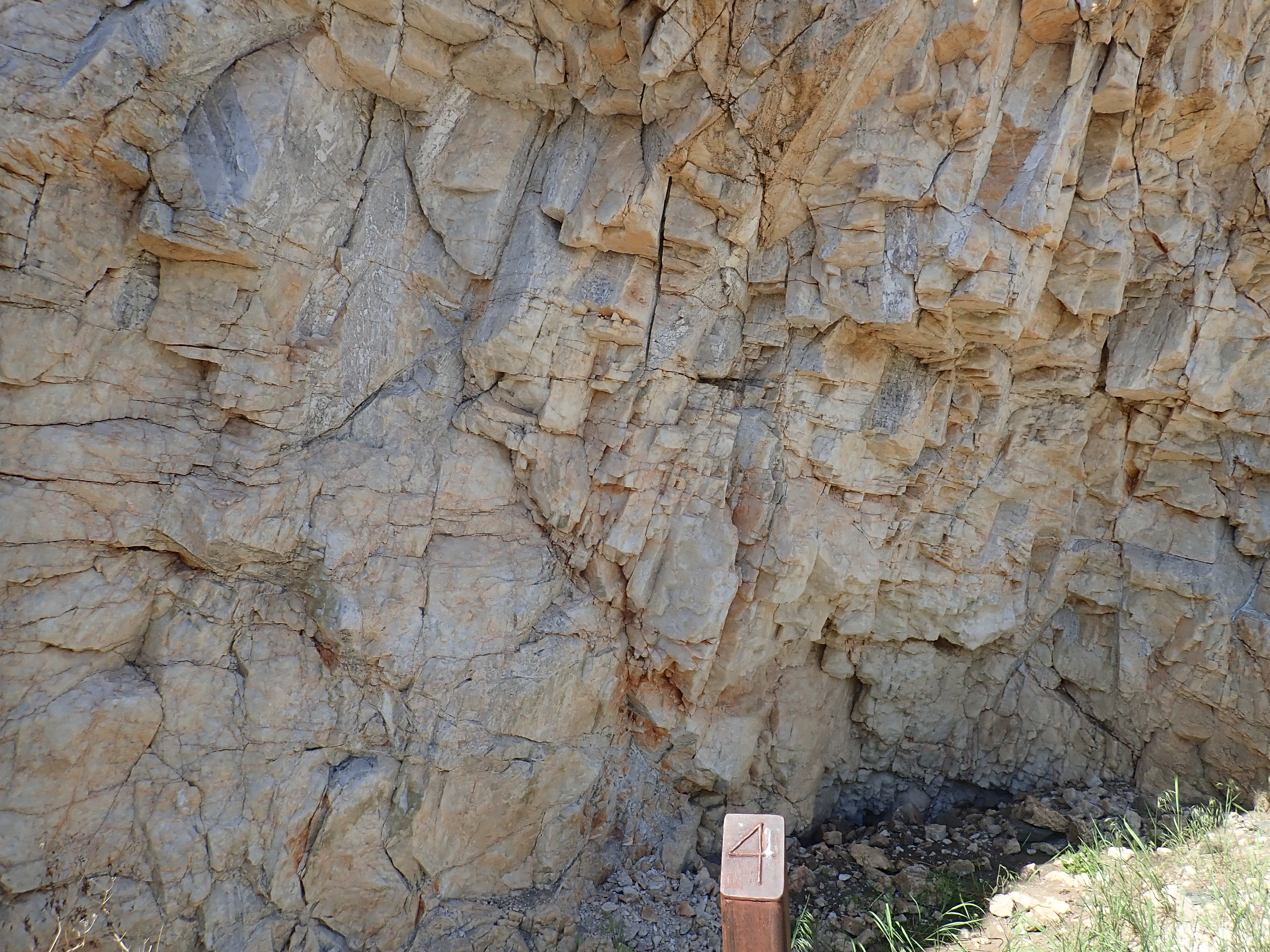
Quartz/rose muscovite zone of the Harding zoned pegmatite

- The core of the dike, known as "spotted rock", which is relatively fine-grained spodumene, microcline, and quartz, with accompanying finer-grained albite, lithium-bearing muscovite, lepidolite, microlite, and tantalite. Much of the spodumene and microcline have been extensively corroded and replaced by fine-grained micas.

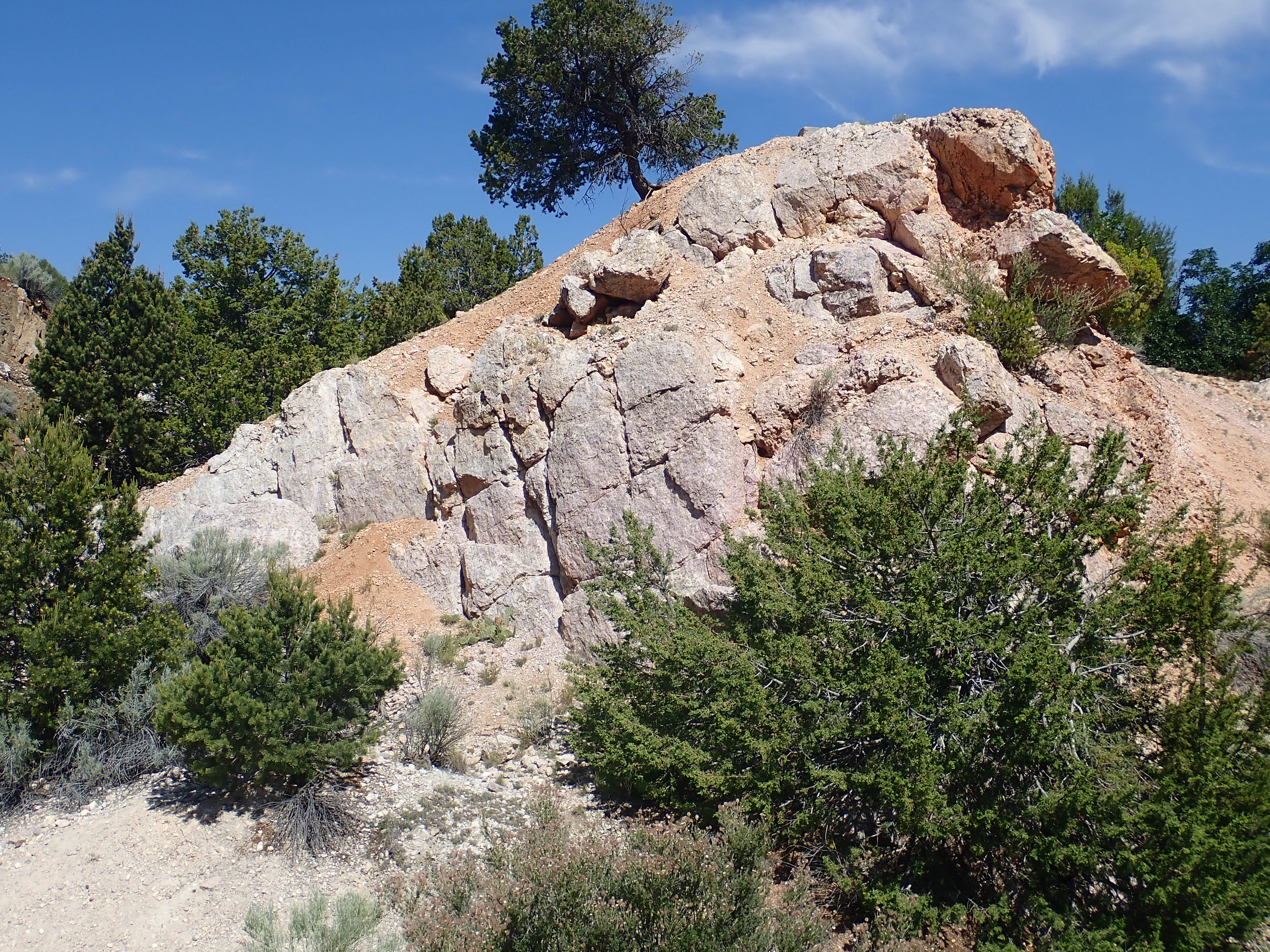
"Spotted rock" of the Harding pegmatite

These zones are mirrored at the base of the pegmatite, except that the lower zones tend to be poorer in beryl and more aplitic than pegmatitic. The abundant fine-grained albite is sugary in appearance.

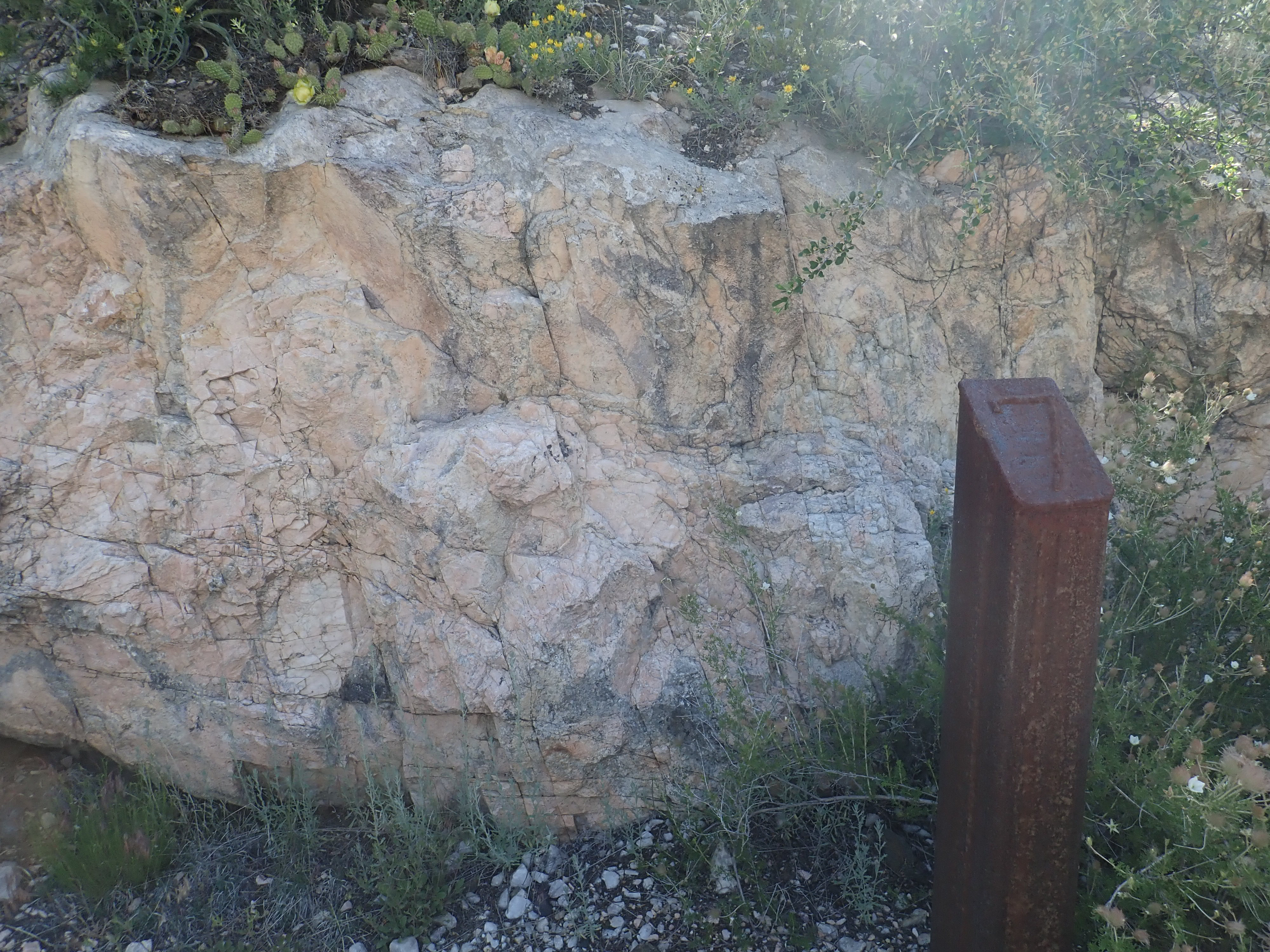
Aplite zone at the Harding Mine

Additional accessory minerals, of no economic importance but of interest to mineral collectors, include almandine, spessartine, and pyrochlore.

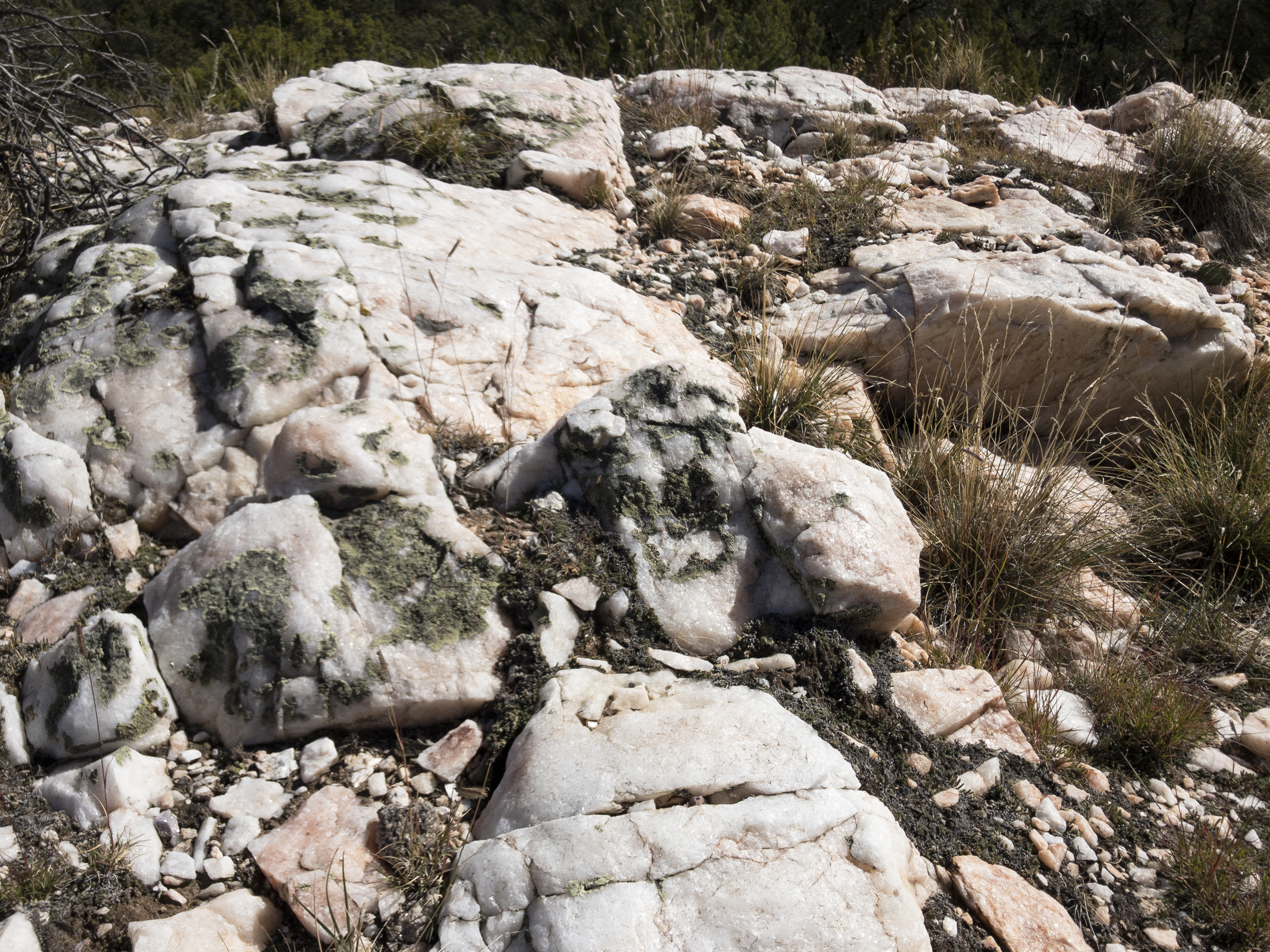
Massive quartz pegmatite

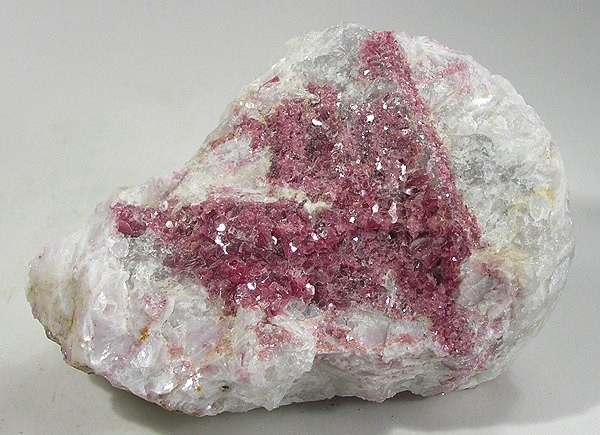
Lithium muscovite

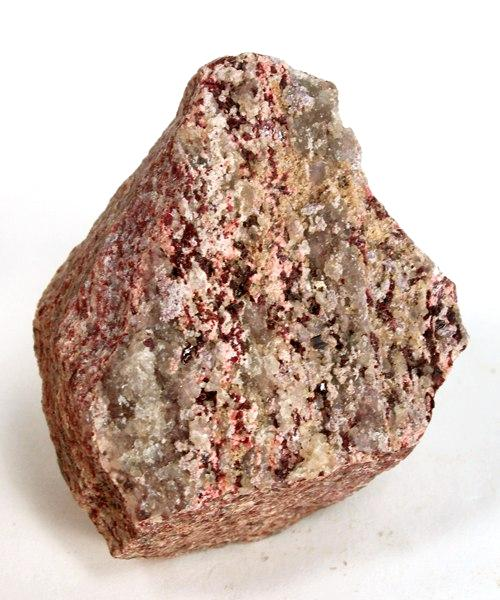
Unusual piemontite-zoisite

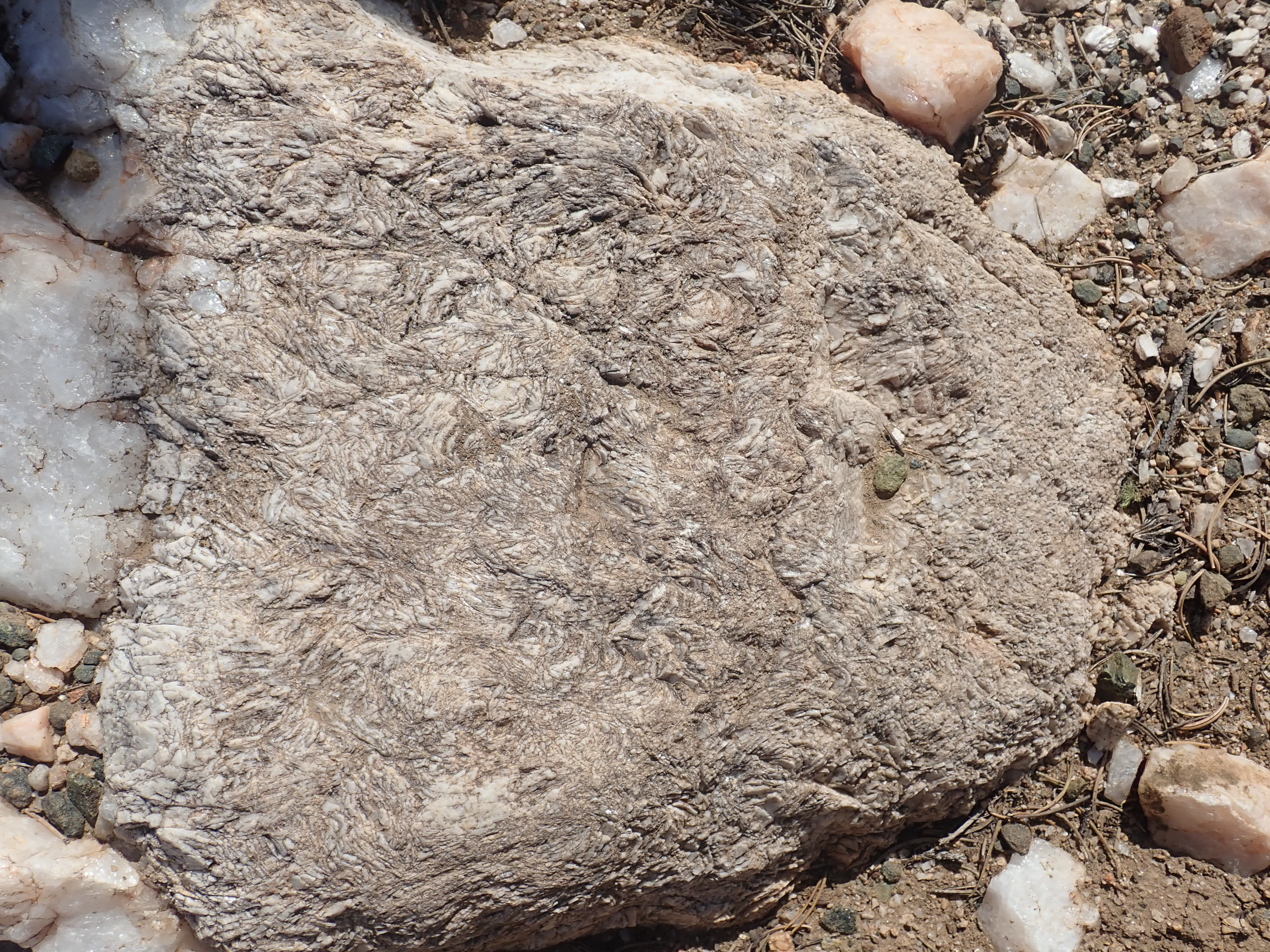
Cleavelandite

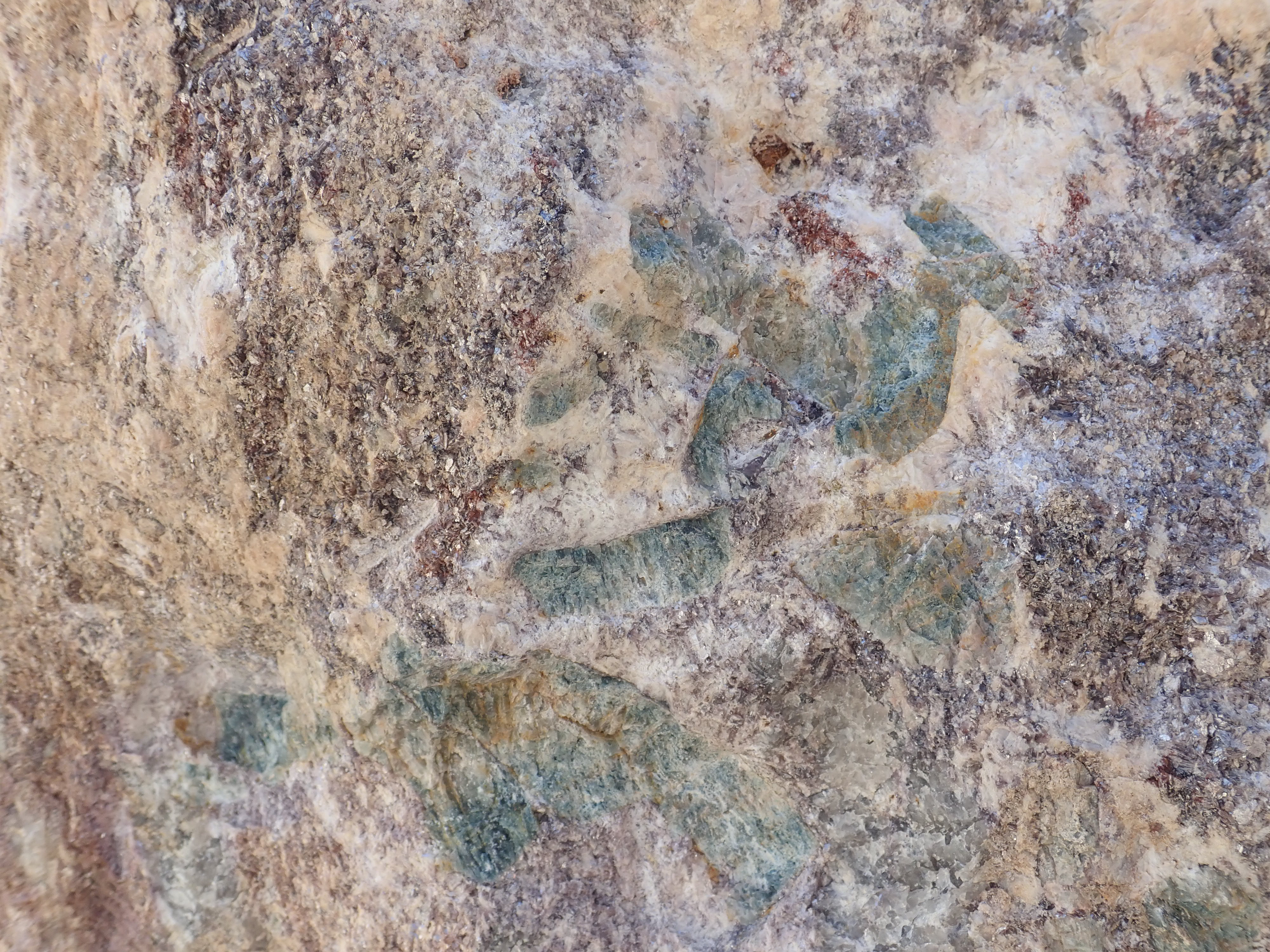
Apatite

Geochemical analysis and analysis of fluid inclusions suggests the pegmatite was injected at temperatures near 600 °C at a depth of 6.0 to 7.5 km (2.0 to 2.5 kbar). The primary zones crystallized under closed-system conditions a temperature of 525 to 425 °C. A separate immiscible CO_{2}-H_{2}O volatile-rich fluid was present in the pegmatite system during crystallization of the primary pegmatite zones. The sugary albite zone formed from a residual Na-rich magma as a response to late-stage pressure release. Saline brines caused lepidolite replacement at temperatures near 265 °C. Finally, small pockets of quartz, feldspar and microlite were crystallized.

== Ownership ==
In 1974, Arthur Montgomery offered to donate the property to the University of New Mexico. The university leased the property for four years while making numerous improvements, which include a walking tour of the mine. Because the mine property included both patented and unpatented claims, transfer of the title required an act of Congress (Senate Bill 1403). The United States retains the right to mine strategic minerals should it become necessary for the security of the United States.

Persons wishing to visit the mine must contact the chairman, Department of Geology, University of New Mexico, 87131 to obtain permission (which is almost always granted) and release forms.
