= Metasedimentary rock =

Metamorphic rock from a sedimentary precursor

In geology, metasedimentary rock is a type of metamorphic rock. Such a rock was first formed through the deposition and solidification of sediment. Then, the rock was buried underneath subsequent rock and was subjected to high pressures and temperatures, causing the rock to recrystallize. The overall composition of a metasedimentary rock can be used to identify the original sedimentary rock, even where they have been subject to high-grade metamorphism and intense deformation.

== Types of metasedimentary rocks ==
Sedimentary rock	Metamorphic equivalent
Pure Limestone	Marble
Impure (Silica or clay-rich) Limestone	Calc–silicate rock
Mudstone	Pelite
Siltstone	Semi-pelite
Sandstone	Psammite, Quartzite
Conglomerate	Metaconglomerate
Shale	Slate

== See also ==
- Metavolcanic rock – Metamorphic rock from a volcanic precursor
