= Las Tablas, New Mexico =

Las Tablas
- Unincorporated community
- Location within the state of New Mexico Las Tablas (the United States)
- Coordinates: 36°33′20″N 106°01′45″W
- Country: United States
- State: New Mexico
- County: Rio Arriba
- Elevation: 7,527 ft (2,294 m)
- Time zone: UTC-7 (Mountain (MST))
  - Summer (DST): UTC-6 (MDT)
- Area code: 505
- GNIS feature ID: 907880

Las Tablas is an unincorporated community located in Rio Arriba County, New Mexico, United States. The community is 28.8 miles (46.3 km) northeast of Abiquiú. Las Tablas had its own post office until July 29, 1995.
