= Metaconglomerate =

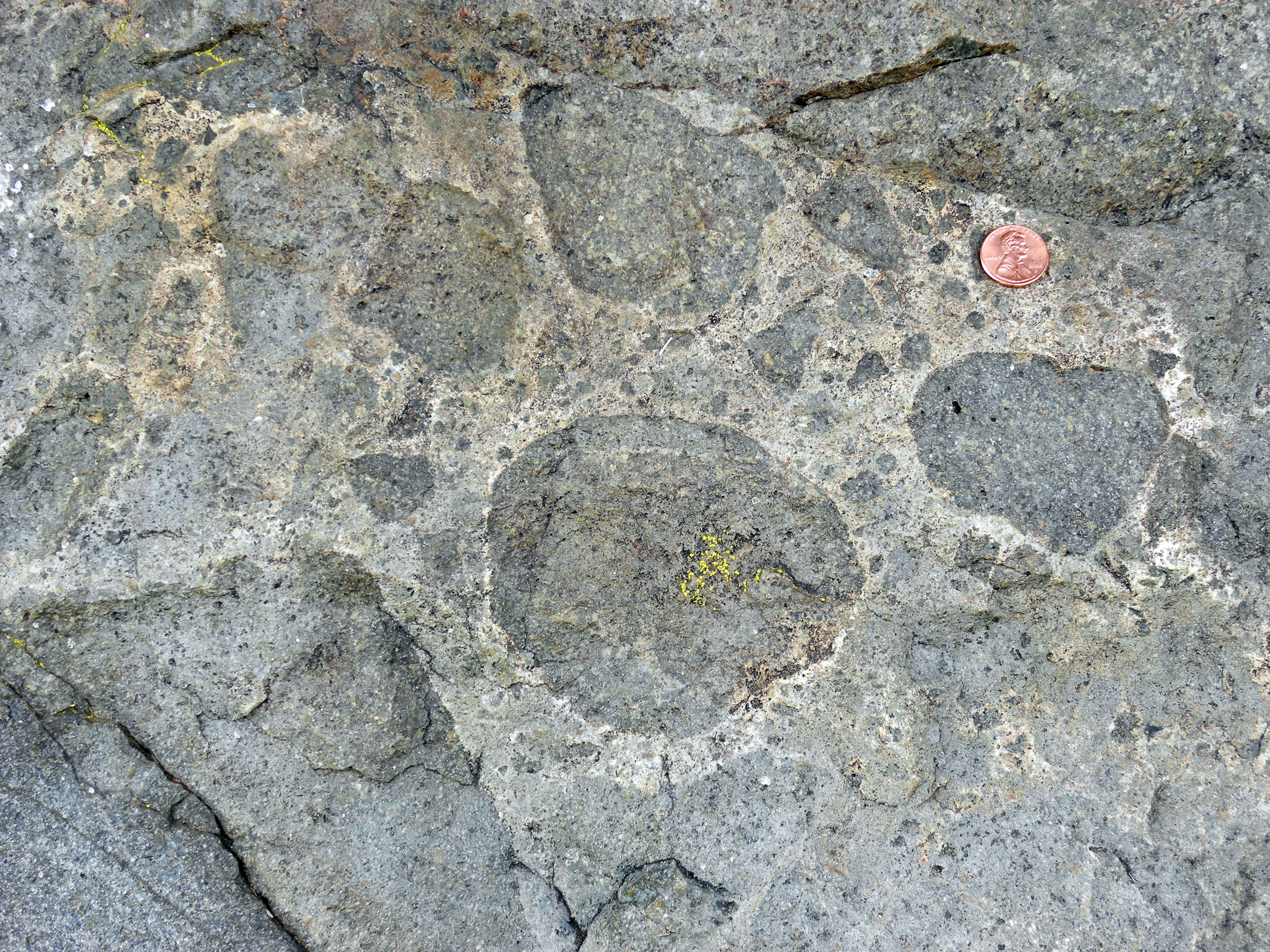
Jurassic metaconglomerate at Los Peñasquitos Canyon Preserve, San Diego County, California

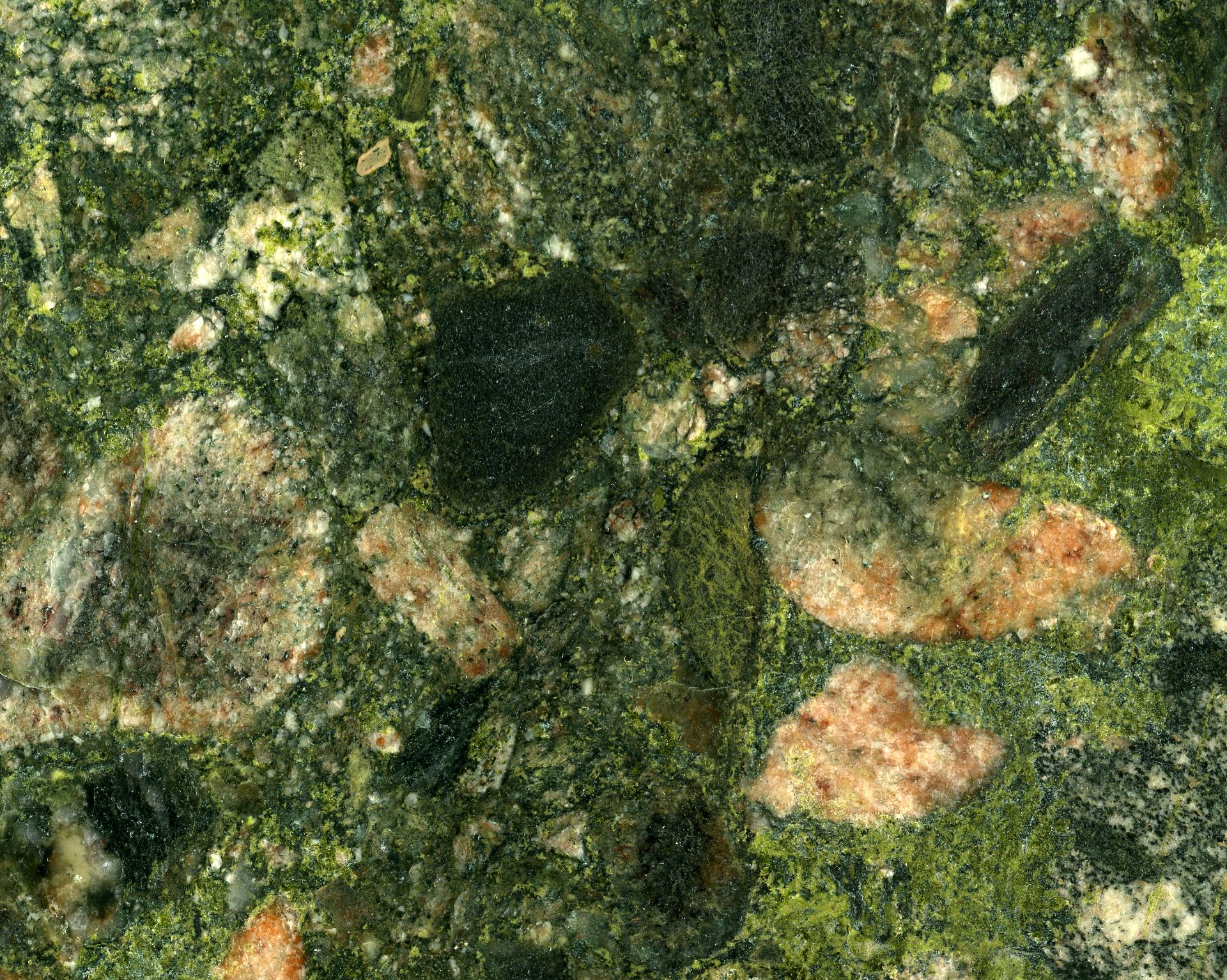
Polymict metaconglomerate, sold as "Marinace Green Granite," from Bahia, Brazil. This rock is dominated by pebbles & granules of granite, gneiss, and mafic igneous rocks. Some clasts have been partially epidotized. The matrix is dominated by epidote (green), quartz, and tremolite.

Metaconglomerate is a rock type which originated from conglomerate after undergoing metamorphism. Conglomerate is easily identifiable by the pebbles or larger clasts in a matrix of sand, silt, or clay. Metaconglomerate looks similar to conglomerate, although sometimes the clasts are deformed. The cement matrix of conglomerate is not as durable as the grains, and hence when broken, conglomerate breaks around the grains. Metaconglomerate, however, breaks through the grains, as the cement has recrystallized and may be as durable as the clasts.

Foliated metaconglomerate is created under the same metamorphic conditions that produce slate or phyllite, but with the parent rock (protolith) being conglomerate, rather than clay.

The metaconglomerates of the Jack Hills of Western Australia are the source rocks for much of the detrital zircons that have been dated to be as old as 4.4 billion years.
