= Tusas Mountains =

Mountain range in New Mexico, United States

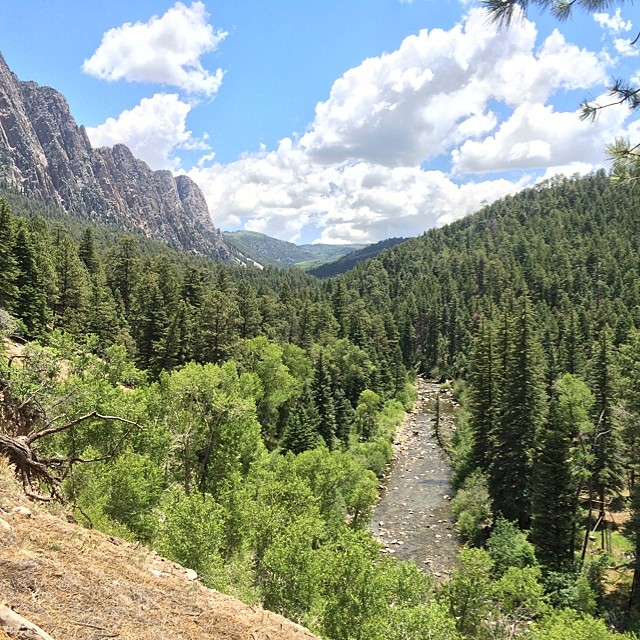
- Brazos Cliffs and Valley, New Mexico

Highest point
- Peak: 11,407 ft (3,477 m), Grouse Mesa

Dimensions
- Length: 67 mi (108 km) north-south
- Width: 59 mi (95 km) east-west
- Area: 2,709 mi^{2} (7,020 km^{2})

Geography
- Location within New Mexico
- Country: United States
- State: New Mexico
- Range coordinates: 36°28′47″N 106°15′06″W

The Tusas Mountains (Tewa: Kí P’in, Northern Tiwa: Kithɨp’ianena) are a mountain range in northern New Mexico, extending slightly into southern Colorado. They are considered the southeasternmost part of the San Juan Mountains. Grouse Mesa, 11,407 feet (3,477 m), is the highest peak in the range. The mountains are located to the west of Taos and northwest of Santa Fe. The Tusas Mountains are a wide region of upland mesas and gently sloping mountains, dissected in places by deep canyons.

== Geography ==
The eastern part of the range is primarily located in the Carson National Forest, bordered by the Taos Plateau volcanic field and Rio Grande del Norte National Monument to the east. It provides the headwaters for the Rio San Antonio, a tributary of the Conejos River (which flows into the Rio Grande in Colorado), and further south the Rio Tusas and Rio Vallecito, which form the Rio Ojo Caliente, a tributary of the Rio Chama (also a Rio Grande tributary). Numerous volcanic features are located along the eastern edge of the range bordering the Taos plateau including nearby San Antonio Mountain.

Much of the western part of the range, also known as the Brazos Mountains, is in the privately owned Tierra Amarilla Land Grant. The terrain consists of harder granite and metamorphic rock, and is more rugged than the eastern side. It includes features such as the Brazos Cliffs and several small mountain lakes including Hidden Lake and Sugar Loaf Lake. It is drained primarily by the Rio Chama and its tributary the Rio Brazos.

=== Climate ===
Grouse Mesa, the highest peak in the Tusas Mountains, has a subalpine climate (Köppen Dfc).

Climate data for Grouse Mesa 36.8343 N, 106.3989 W, Elevation: 11,198 ft (3,413 m) (1991–2020 normals)
Month	Jan	Feb	Mar	Apr	May	Jun	Jul	Aug	Sep	Oct	Nov	Dec	Year
Mean daily maximum °F (°C)	29.3 (−1.5)	30.4 (−0.9)	37.0 (2.8)	43.1 (6.2)	51.9 (11.1)	63.4 (17.4)	67.4 (19.7)	65.1 (18.4)	59.1 (15.1)	49.0 (9.4)	36.5 (2.5)	29.2 (−1.6)	46.8 (8.2)
Daily mean °F (°C)	18.6 (−7.4)	19.4 (−7.0)	25.1 (−3.8)	30.8 (−0.7)	39.6 (4.2)	50.0 (10.0)	54.5 (12.5)	52.8 (11.6)	47.0 (8.3)	37.3 (2.9)	26.0 (−3.3)	18.8 (−7.3)	35.0 (1.7)
Mean daily minimum °F (°C)	7.8 (−13.4)	8.4 (−13.1)	13.2 (−10.4)	18.4 (−7.6)	27.3 (−2.6)	36.5 (2.5)	41.5 (5.3)	40.4 (4.7)	34.9 (1.6)	25.7 (−3.5)	15.4 (−9.2)	8.5 (−13.1)	23.2 (−4.9)
Average precipitation inches (mm)	4.61 (117)	4.75 (121)	4.53 (115)	3.20 (81)	2.41 (61)	0.86 (22)	2.41 (61)	3.35 (85)	2.84 (72)	3.03 (77)	3.51 (89)	4.53 (115)	40.03 (1,016)
Source: PRISM Climate Group

== History ==
Gold and silver were discovered in the Tusas in 1881, but the deposits were of low quality and the area never saw significant mining activity.

In 1986 the United States Board on Geographic Names redefined the Brazos Mountains, originally considered a separate mountain range, as part of the Tusas Mountains, although the old name is still locally used.

== Highest peaks ==
Rank	Name	Elevation	Prominence	Coordinates
1	Grouse Mesa	11,407 ft (3,476 m)	1,365 ft (416 m)	36°49′53″N 106°24′27″W
2	Brazos Peak	11,286 ft (3,440 m)	498 ft (151 m)	36°48′31″N 106°22′56″W
3	Unnamed peak	11,060 ft (3,371 m)	840 ft (256 m)	
4	Unnamed peak	10,977 ft (3,345 m)	357 ft (109 m)	
5	Brazos Ridge	10,745 ft (3,275 m)	580 ft (177 m)	36°55′32″N 106°21′27″W

== Works cited ==
- Julyan, Robert (2006). The Mountains of New Mexico. UNM Press. ISBN 0-82633-516-0.
