= Los Pinos Formation =

Geologic formation in New Mexico, USA

- Stratigraphic range: Late Oligocene-Late Miocene; 28.2–4.5 Ma
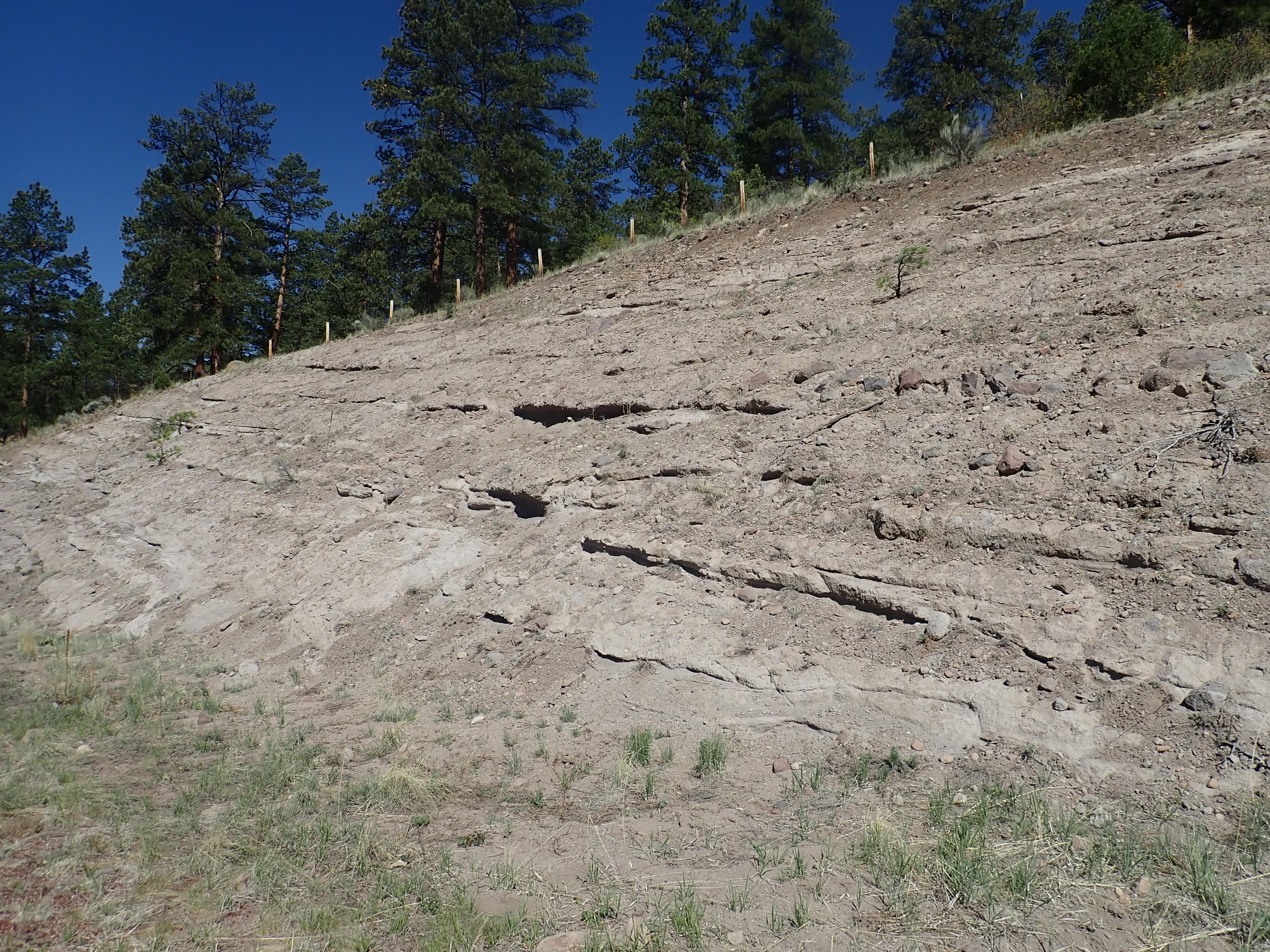
- Esquibel Member of Los Pinos Formation
- Type: Formation
- Sub-units: Esquibel & Cordito Members
- Underlies: Servilleta Formation
- Overlies: Treasure Mountain Group, Masonic Park Tuff
- Area: 26,000 km^{2} (10,000 mi^{2})
- Thickness: 500 ft (150 m)

Lithology
- Primary: Volcaniclastic

Location
- Coordinates: 36.950°N 106.124°W
- Region: Northern New Mexico
- Country: United States

Type section
- Named for: Los Pinos Creek
- Named by: E.S. Larsen
- Year defined: 1932
- Los Pinos Formation (the United States) Los Pinos Formation (New Mexico)

The Los Pinos Formation is a geologic formation in northern New Mexico. It was deposited from the late Oligocene through the late Miocene epochs, based on radiometric ages of interbedded lava flows and overlying and underlying formations.

== Description ==
The Los Pinos Formation is principally volcaniclastic, with interbedded tuffs and basalt flows. It crops out in the Tusas Mountains of New Mexico. The type section is located along Los Pinos Creek, near the town of San Miguel in extreme northern New Mexico (36.9614°N 106.1693°W). It also likely present in the subsurface of the southwestern San Luis basin, particularly in the Broke Off Mountain sub basin.

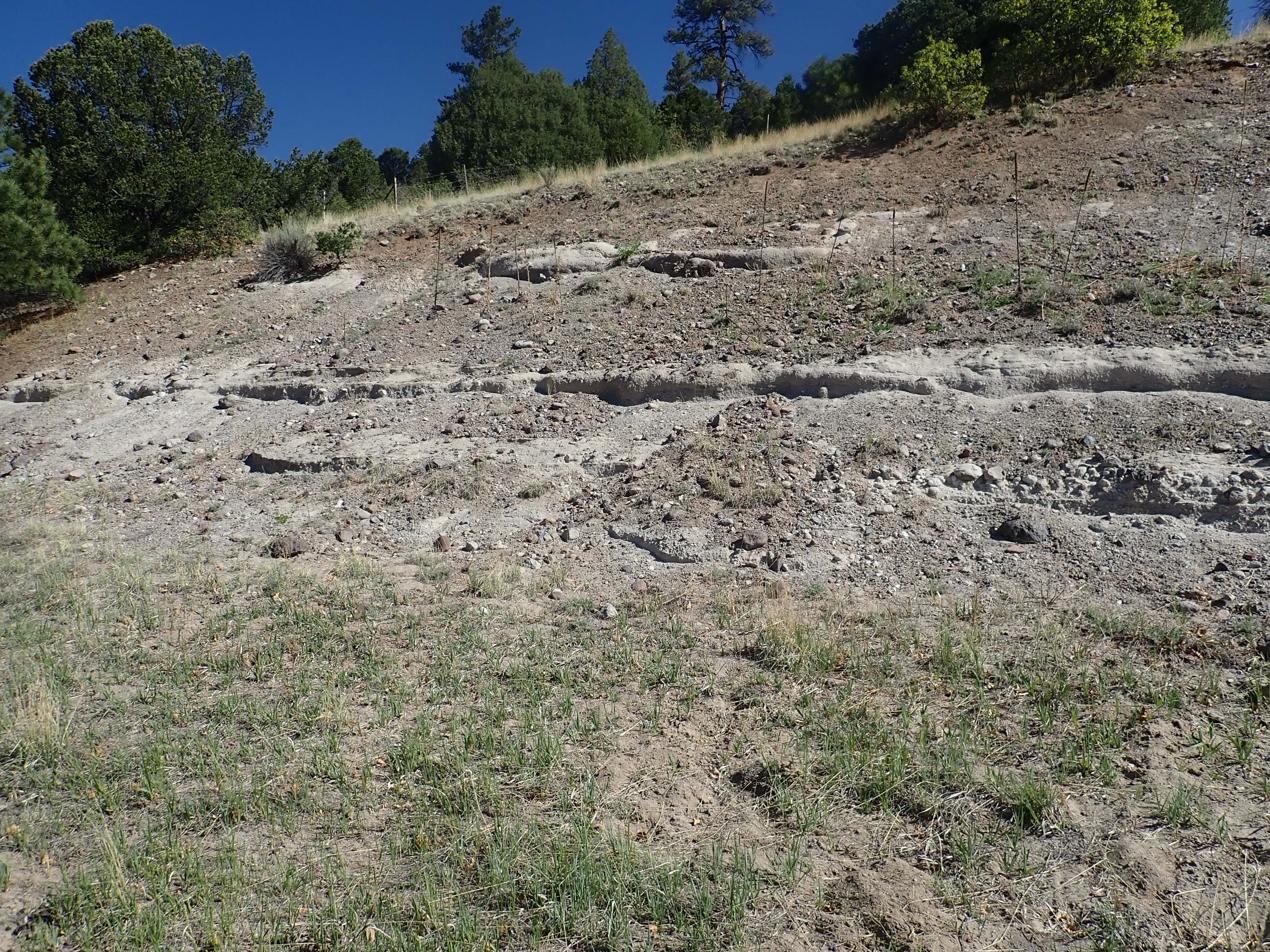
Road cut exposing Cordito Member

The Los Pinos Formation is divided into two penecontemporaneous members. The Esquibel Member is a detrital apron of volcanic clasts, mostly intermediate in composition, eroded mostly from the San Juan volcanic field to the north. It thins to the south, where it underlies the Cordito Member. The Cordito Member, composed mostly of rhyolitic clasts, was eroded from source areas to the east, such the Latir volcanic field and possibly another center buried beneath basalt flows of the Servilleta Formation in the Rio Grande rift. It is present only in the southern Tusas Mountains. The Abiquiu Formation may correlate with the Cordito Member.

The age of the formation is presently constrained by radiometric ages of interbedded flows and underlying and overlying formations. The underlying Treasure Mountain and Masonic Park Tuffs have radiometric ages of 29.8 to 28.2 million years (Ma). Interbedded flows have been dated at 17.7 Ma and 20.7 Ma. Flows of the overlying Servilleta Formation are 4.5 Ma old.

== History of investigation ==
The formation was named the Los Pinos Gravel by E.S. Larsen and reported in 1932. It was designated the Los Pinos Member of the Hinsdale Formation, which it closely resembles, by Charles Whitman Cross and Larsen in 1935, and raised to formation rank by Fred Barker in 1958.
