= Gilman Conglomerate =

Geologic formation in New Mexico, USA

- Stratigraphic range: Oligocene
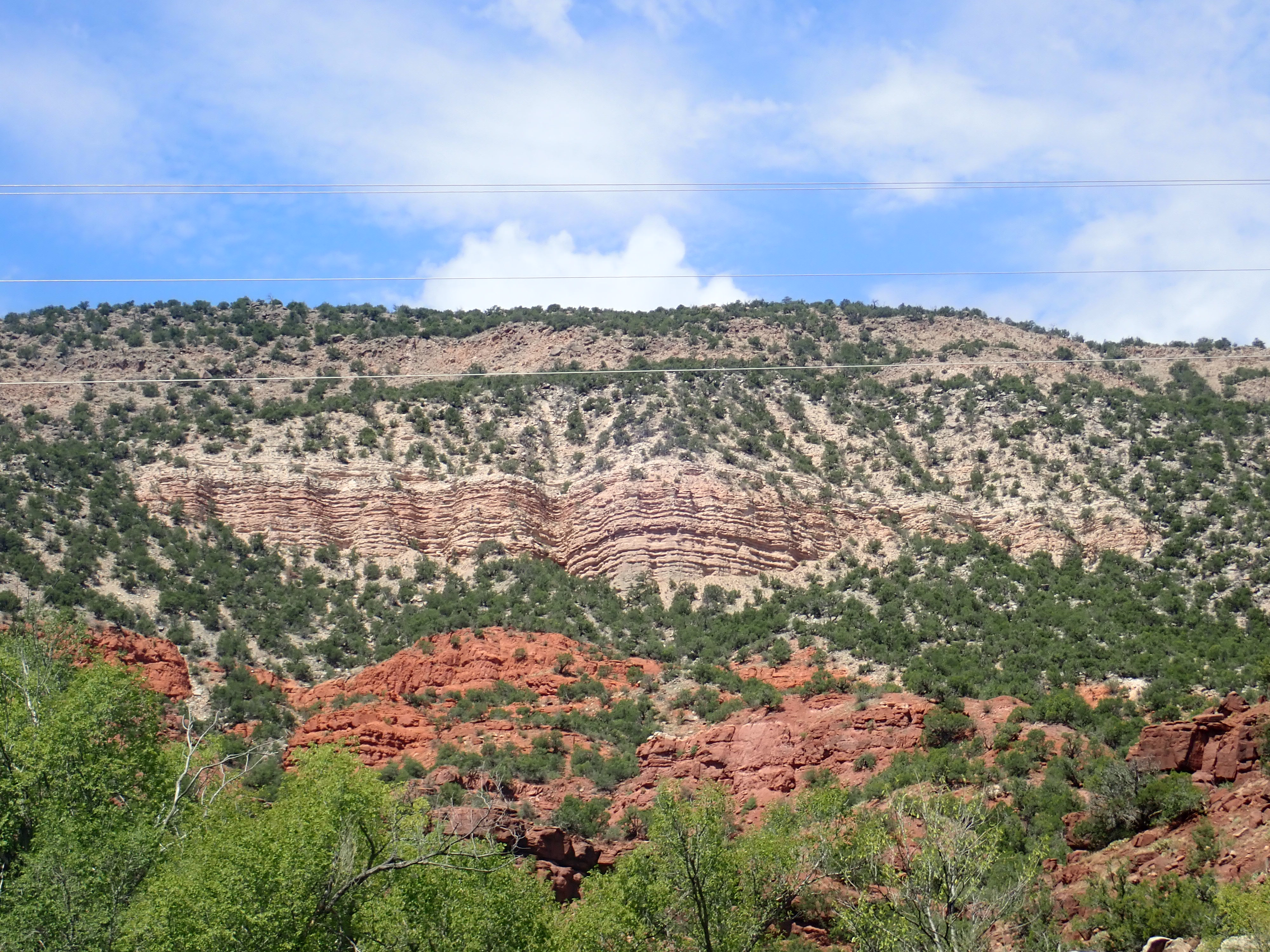
- Gilman Conglomerate at Gilman, New Mexico
- Type: Formation
- Underlies: Abiquiu Formation
- Overlies: Abo Formation
- Thickness: 59 m (194 ft)

Lithology
- Primary: Conglomerate

Location
- Coordinates: 35.7175607°N 106.7669774°W
- Region: New Mexico
- Country: United States

Type section
- Named for: Gilman (settlement)
- Named by: Kelley et al.
- Year defined: 2009
- Gilman Conglomerate (the United States) Gilman Conglomerate (New Mexico)

The Gilman Conglomerate is a geologic formation in northern New Mexico dating to the Oligocene epoch.

== Description ==
The formation is composed of poorly sorted, weakly bedded, greenish-gray volcaniclastic conglomerate. Its lowermost and uppermost sections are a pinkish color from their content of Proterozoic pebbles, but the bulk of the formation is dominated by a mixture of crystal-rich porphyritic dacite and crystal-poor porphyritic andesite. Radiometric dating yields ages of 28.55 to 29.38 Ma for the clasts. Paleocurrents are to the north, suggesting a source in an Oligocene volcanic field now buried under the southern Jemez Mountains or in the northern Albuquerque Basin.

The formation crops out in a limited area of the southwestern Jemez Mountains. Maximum thickness is 59 meters (194 feet).

The formation rests unconformably on the Abo Formation and has a gradational contact with the overlying Abiquiu Formation. It occupies the same stratigraphic position as the Ritito Conglomerate, and was originally included in that formation, but its composition and paleocurrent directions point to a quite different source provenance.

== History of investigation ==
The unit was originally included in the Ritito Conglomerate by H.R. DuChene in 1973. It was broken out as a separate formation by Shari Kelley and her coinvestigators in 2009.
