= Latir volcanic field =

Volcanic field in New Mexico

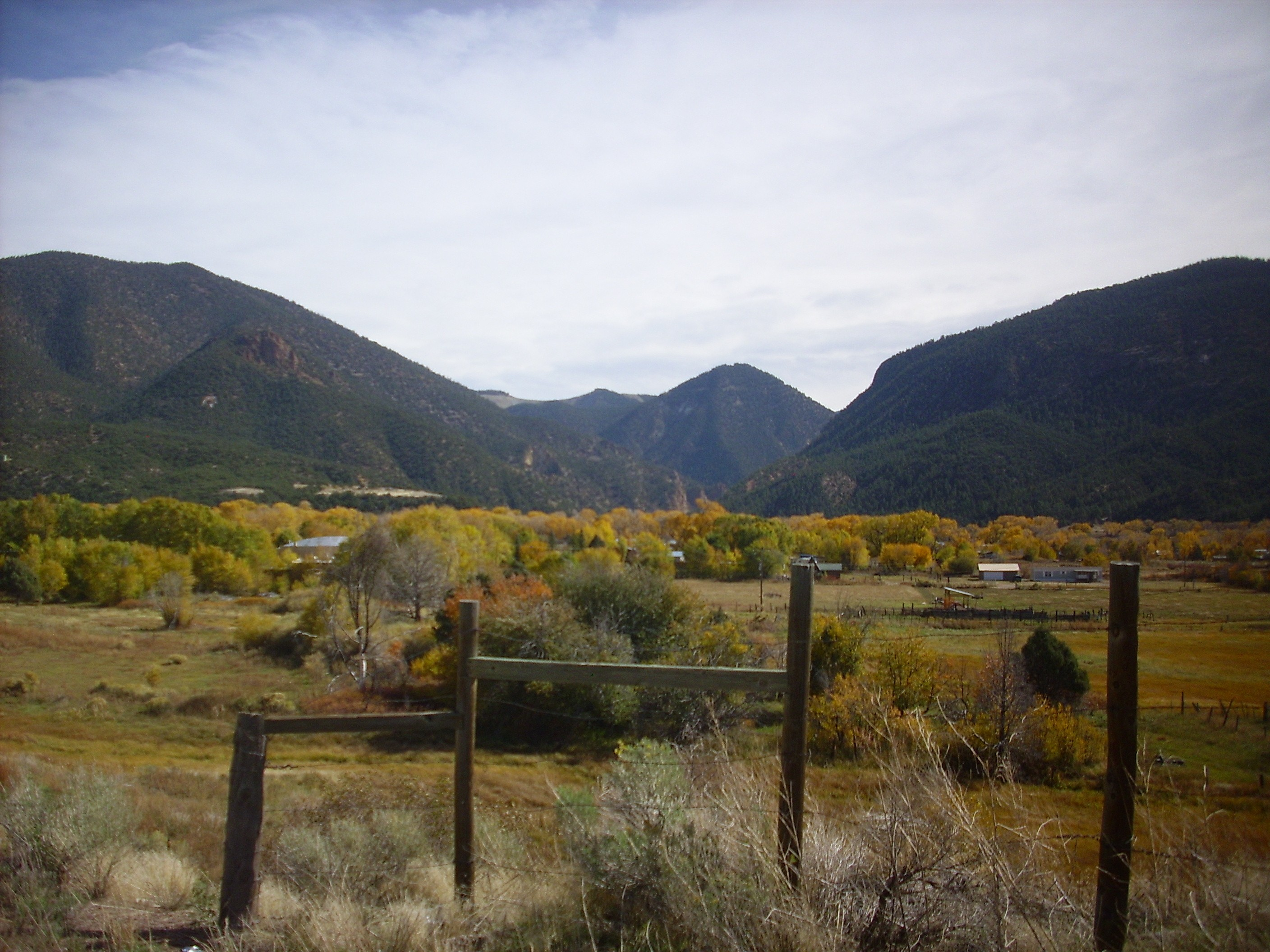
Red River Canyon, near the center of the Latir volcanic field

The Latir volcanic field is a large volcanic field near Questa, New Mexico, that was active during the late Oligocene to early Miocene, 28 to 22 million years ago (Ma). It includes the Questa caldera, in whose deeply eroded interior is located the Molycorp Questa molybdenum mine.

== Description ==
The Latir volcanic field is exposed in the Sangre de Cristo Mountains from Costilla in the north to Arroyo Hondo in the south, and as far east as Van Diest Peak (36.7434°N 105.3176°W) east of the town of Red River. The volcanic field has been deeply eroded, in many places to Proterozoic basement rock, and the underlying plutons are widely exposed. The western part of the field has been thrown down by faulting on the eastern margin of the Rio Grande rift and deeply buried under younger lava flows and sediments of the rift (Servilleta Basalt and Santa Fe Group). Erosional remnants of the Latir field are found on the west side of the Rio Grande rift in the Tusas Mountains.

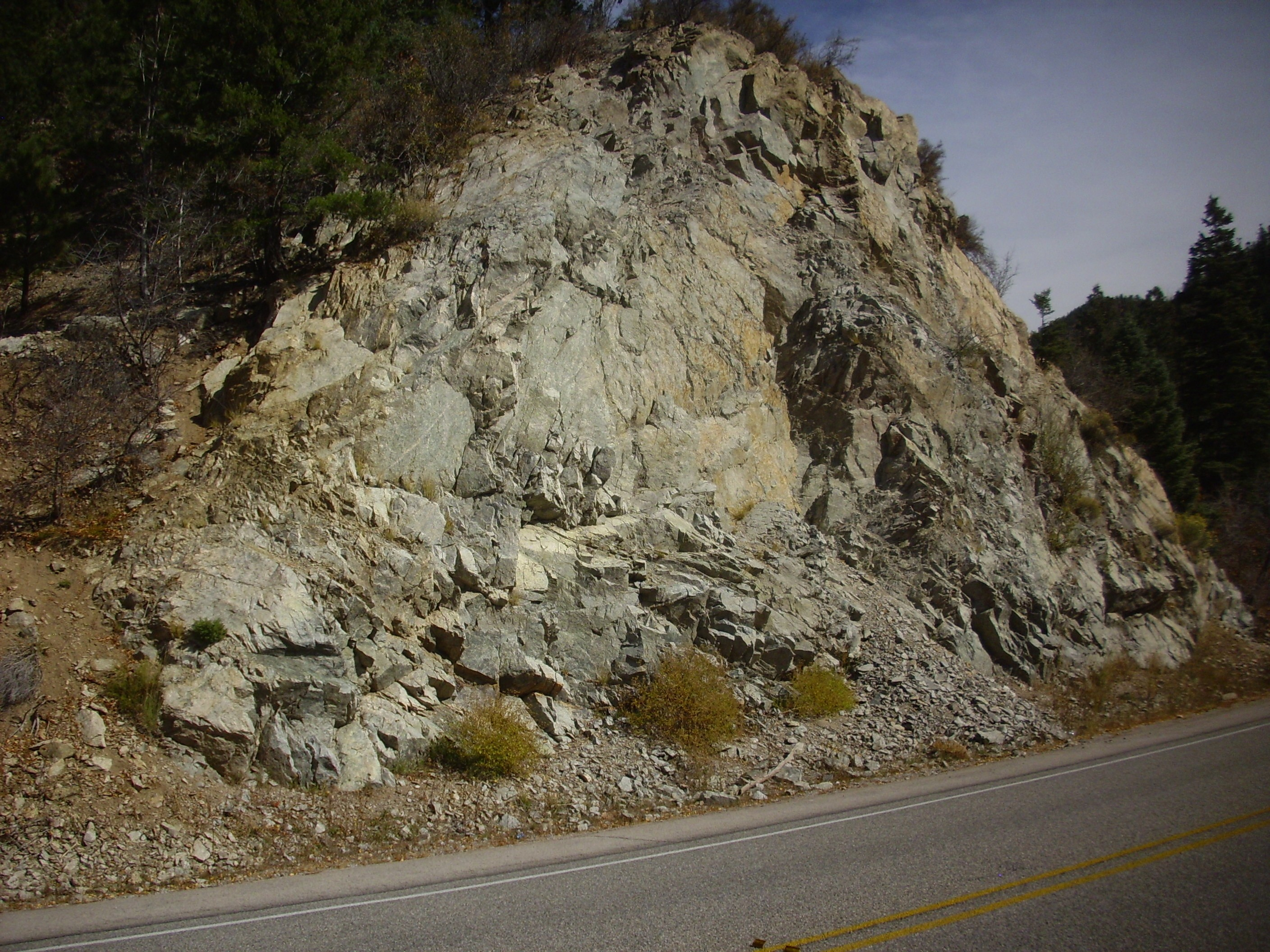
Paleoproterozoic quartz monzonite just outside the ring dike of the Questa caldera

The oldest rocks in the field have been dated to the Paleoproterozoic and range in age from 1750 Ma to 1690 Ma. The older rocks are thus among the oldest rocks exposed in New Mexico. These were overlain by Mississippian limestone and Pennsylvanian and Permian red beds. The area was thrust eastward during the Laramide orogeny, then eroded to low relief, removing much of the sedimentary cover and depositing small amounts of Eocene to Oligocene sediments. The Latir volcanic field was erupted onto this surface.

The earliest volcanism began about 30 Ma and consisted mostly of intermediate composition magmas (andesite and dacite) with small amounts of higher-silica rhyolite erupted from numerous vents. Some thin rhyolite tuffs are attributed to more distant eruptions in the San Juan volcanic field. The precaldera rocks are mostly metaluminous (moderate in aluminum content) with a silica content ranging from 53% (basaltic andesite) to 67% (quartz latite). The rhyolites likely formed from fractionation of the original intermediate magmas. The beginnings of regional extension at 26 Ma coincided with a transition to alkaline volcanism.

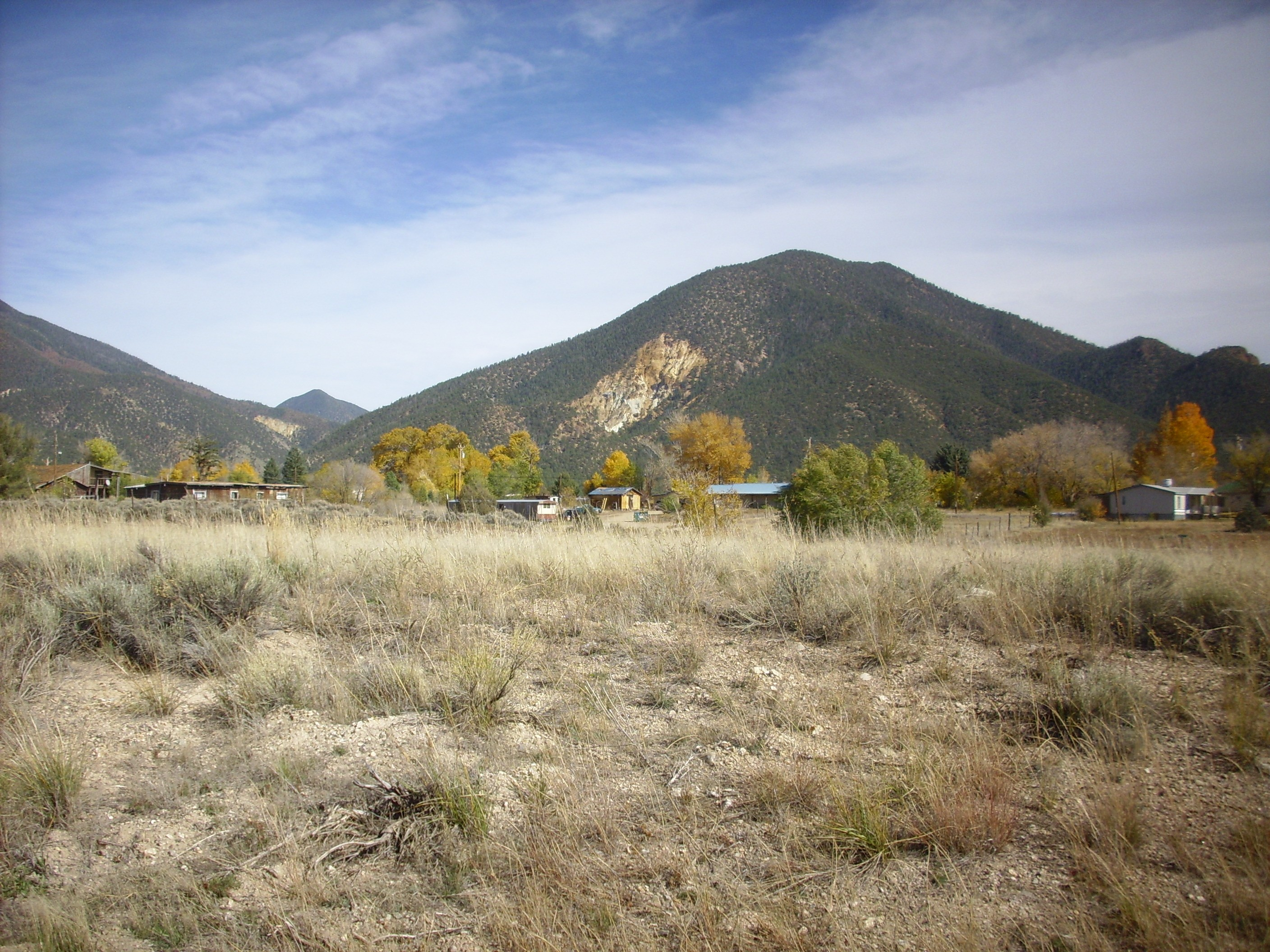
Exposure of Amalia Tuff within the heavily eroded Questa caldera

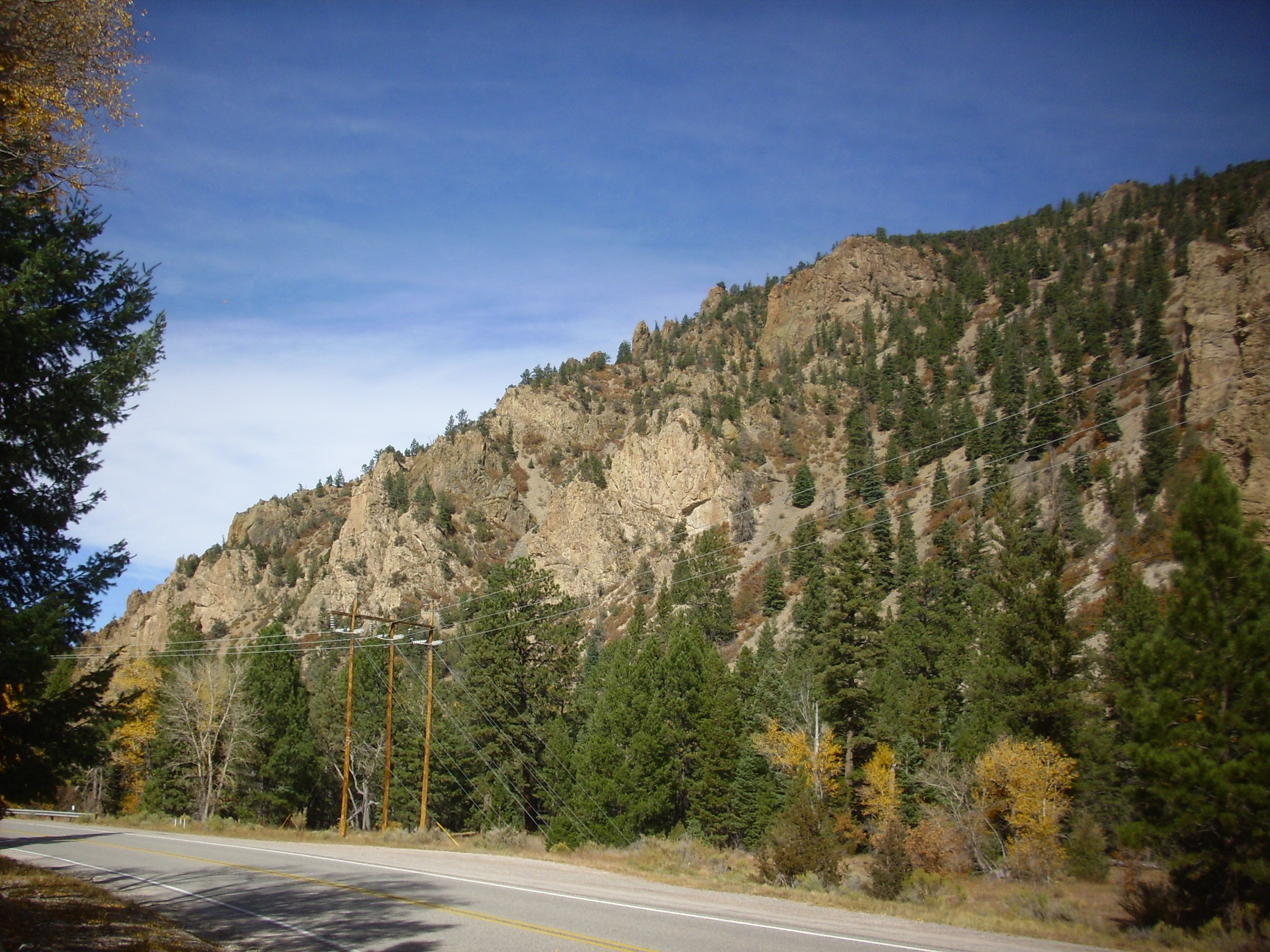
Ring dike of Questa Caldera exposed in Red River canyon

The early volcanism was associated with the growth of a batholith in the upper crust beneath the field. The batholith broke through to the surface at 25 Ma and erupted some 500–1,000 cubic kilometres (120–240 cu mi) of peralkaline (alkali-rich) rhyolite ash flows to form an outflow sheet of densely welded Amalia Tuff. The emptied batholith collapsed to form the Questa caldera, which is at least 14 kilometres (8.7 miles) across.

The deep erosion of the caldera has made it a useful laboratory for understanding processes occurring below the surface in calderas. For example, fission track dating shows that the upper part of the batholith beneath the caldera had cooled to 100°C by a million years after emplacement and that uplift increased to the south.

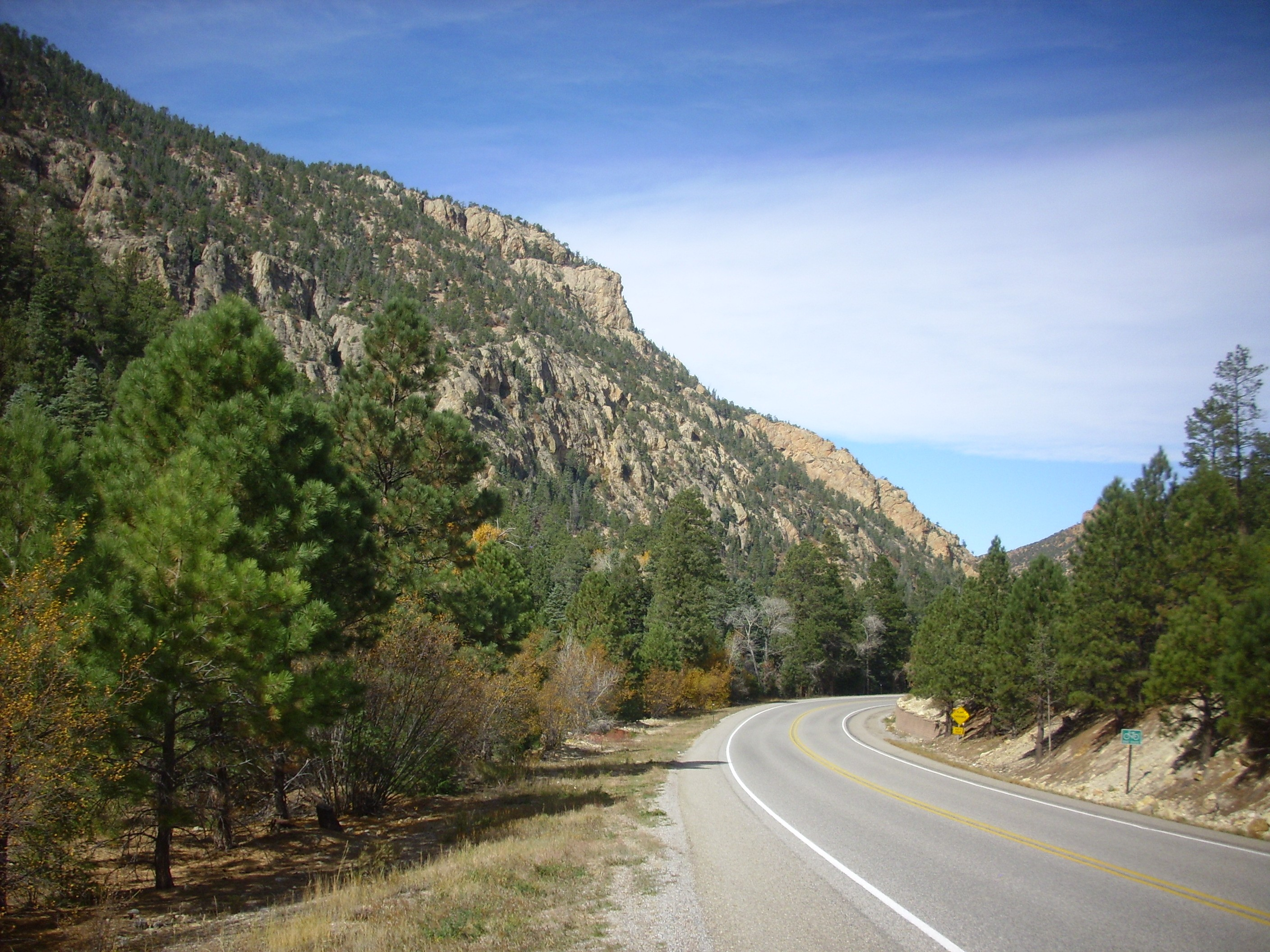
Bear Canyon Pluton of the Latir volcanic field, east of Questa, New Mexico, USA

Magma continued to rise into the volcanic field, forming post-caldera batholiths that intrude both the caldera fill and the nearby pre-caldera volcanic and basement rocks. These intrusions likely drove resurgence of the caldera floor. All of these intrusions took place significantly later than the caldera eruption, with only the ring dike itself having an age comparable to the eruption, and so cannot be part of the original magma chamber. The intrusions continued into the early Miocene, 22 million years ago. These were accompanied by postcaldera eruptions, but the postcaldera flows have been entirely eroded away except in the Timber and Brushy Mountains (36.713°N 105.753°W), a small intrarift horst within the Rio Grande rift.

The Latir volcanic field is the southern terminus of a southward migrating Tertiary magmatic locus that blanketed much of the southern Rocky Mountains with volcanic rock during the Eocene and Oligocene. It has been suggested that this migration of volcanic activity heated and weakened the lithosphere along its path to produce focuses for later extensional deformation of the eastern Cordillera.

=== Magmatic sources ===
The magmas erupted in the Latir volcanic field show isotopic chemistry indicating the magmas evolved in an open system, with crystal fractionation, magma mixing, and crustal assimilation all playing roles. However, the precaldera rocks are overwhelmingly derived from basaltic magmas produced in the upper mantle, rather than melted crust.

The precaldera intermediate-composition rocks likely were produced by mixing between fractionated magma and primitive basalt. This is reflected in unusually high nickel and magnesium contents and in the reverse zoning of hornblende and augite phenocrysts. Isotope data indicates that large amounts of melted crust were assimilated into the magmas, though only one set of flows contain xenocrysts typical of crustal melt. Crustal assimilation took place almost entirely in the deeper levels of the crust.

The Amalia Tuff magma formed from a parent that was enriched in alkali metals and trace elements and had a large component of melted crust. Degassing of underlying volatile-rich alkali basalt may have transported enough alkali elements into the Amalia magma chamber to change the magma to a peralkaline composition. Fractional crystallization took place at an intermediate level of the crust before the final magma body formed at a relatively shallow level.

Miocene lavas from the same region did not assimilate significant crust nor mix with primitive basalts, suggesting that these processes required large magma chambers fed by large flows of basaltic magma from the upper mantle. The Miocene magmas may reflect a time when the flow of basaltic magma had diminished or extensive faulting allowed the magma to erupt before it could pool in the subsurface.

Fractionation of magma deep below the Latir field is estimated to have produced 6–15 kilometres (3.7–9.3 miles) of new crust underneath the field. This may have been accompanied by delamination.

=== Sedimentation ===
The growth of the Latir volcanic field produced enormous quantities of volcaniclastic sediments (Abiquiu Formation). Modeling suggests that these produced an alluvial fan that filled the adjacent basins of the newly opening Rio Grande rift and extended beyond the westernmost bounding faults of the rift. Both subsidence within the rift and flexural subsidence from the weight of the volcanic field contributed accommodation space for sediments, with flexural subsidence accounting for at least 300 meters (980 ft) of accommodation space out to 150 kilometres (93 miles) from the field. Another 100 meters (330 ft) of accommodation was contributed by higher stream gradients, from the increasing elevation of the volcanic field and its contribution of a heavy load of sediments.

== Economic geology ==
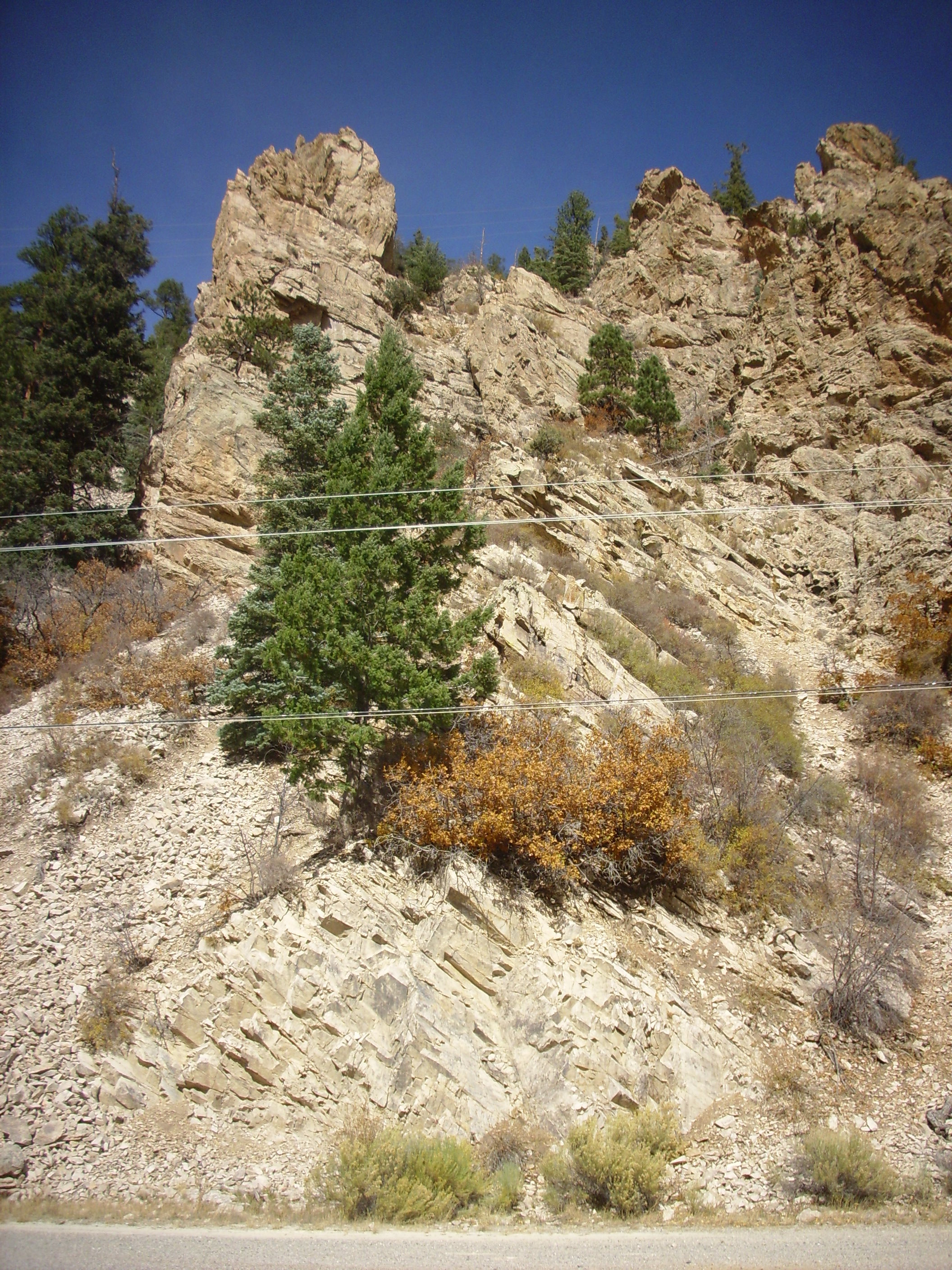
An outcrop of the Sulfur Gulch pluton near the Questa molybdenum mine, New Mexico, USA.

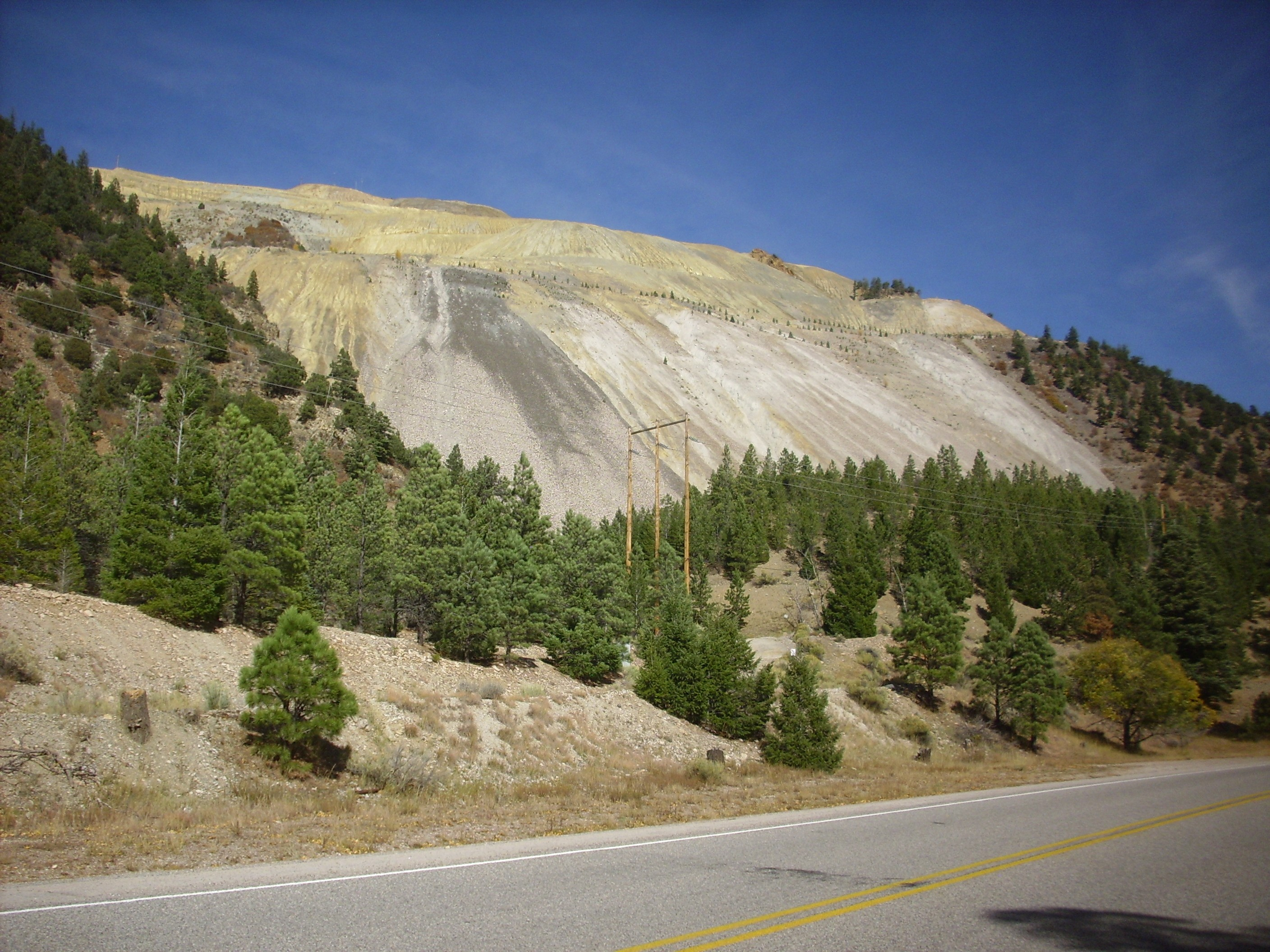
Tailings pile of the Questa molybdenum mine, New Mexico, USA

A rich molybdenum deposit along the Red River east of the town of Questa is related to the emplacement of the Sulfur Gulch post-caldera granitic pluton along the south margin of the Questa caldera at about 23 Ma. Minor molybdenum mineralization is also found in the Bear Canyon and Lucero Peak plutons.

The underground Molycorp molybdenum mine exploited molybdenum mineralization under Goat Hill, which dominates the mouth of the Red River Canyon as seen from the town of Questa. The ore was emplaced by hot meteoric water circulating through fracture zones above the cooling plutons on the south margin of the Questa caldera, with the best deposits found where the Sulfur Gulch pluton meets precaldera andesite. The mineral zone is dominated by pyrite, alkali feldspar, fluorite, calcite, and quartz, with the chief molybdenum ore being molybdenite.

The ore zone is exposed at Sulfur Gulch, so named because the bright yellow molybdenum-rich iron hydroxides weathered out of the ore veins was mistaken for sulfur. The ore itself was mistaken for graphite and use locally as a lubricant for wagon wheels. However, in 1916, prospector Jimmy Fay had a sample analyzed for precious metals and got back a report that the sample contained molybdenite, which was becoming highly prized for industrial uses. The Western Molybdenum Company was organized in La Jara and gathered up claims but did little to develop them. In November 1918, the R and S Molybdenum Company was organized in Denver, purchased seven Western Molybdenum Company claims, and filed additional claims. Production began in the spring of 1919 and ore was concentrated at a converted gold mill on the Red River above the mine.

The Molybdenum Corporation of America acquired the property in 1920, and mining was almost continuous until 1971 except during the height of the Great Depression. The mine was unusual in that the molybdenite occurred as high-grade deposits in fissure veins rather than as low-grade disseminated ore. Total production by 1956 was 18,095,000 pounds of molybdenite. The mine was shut down "permanently" in 2014.

== See also ==
- Latir Peak Wilderness
