= San Pedro quartz monzonite =

Plutonic rock found in New Mexico, US

San Pedro quartz orthogneiss
- Stratigraphic range: Statherian
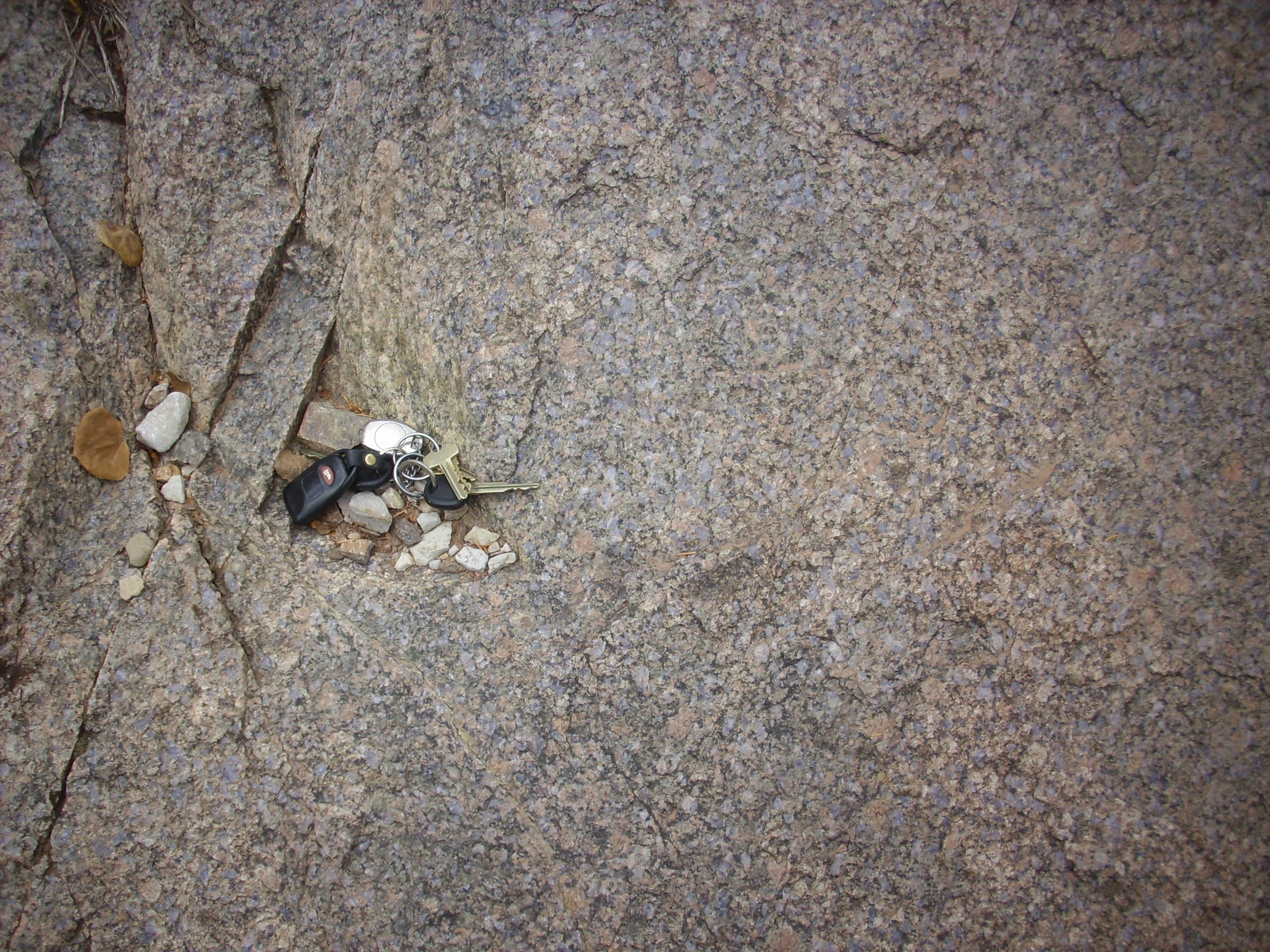
- Outcrop of San Pedro quartz monzonite
- Type: Pluton

Lithology
- Primary: Quartz monzonite

Location
- Coordinates: 36.023°N 106.847°W
- Region: San Pedro Mountains, New Mexico
- Country: United States

Type section
- Named for: San Pedro Mountains, New Mexico
- Named by: Woodrow
- Year defined: 1987
- San Pedro quartz monzonite (the United States) San Pedro quartz monzonite (New Mexico)

The San Pedro quartz monzonite is a Paleoproterozoic pluton in New Mexico. It has a radiometric age of 1730 Mya, corresponding to the Statherian period.

== Description ==
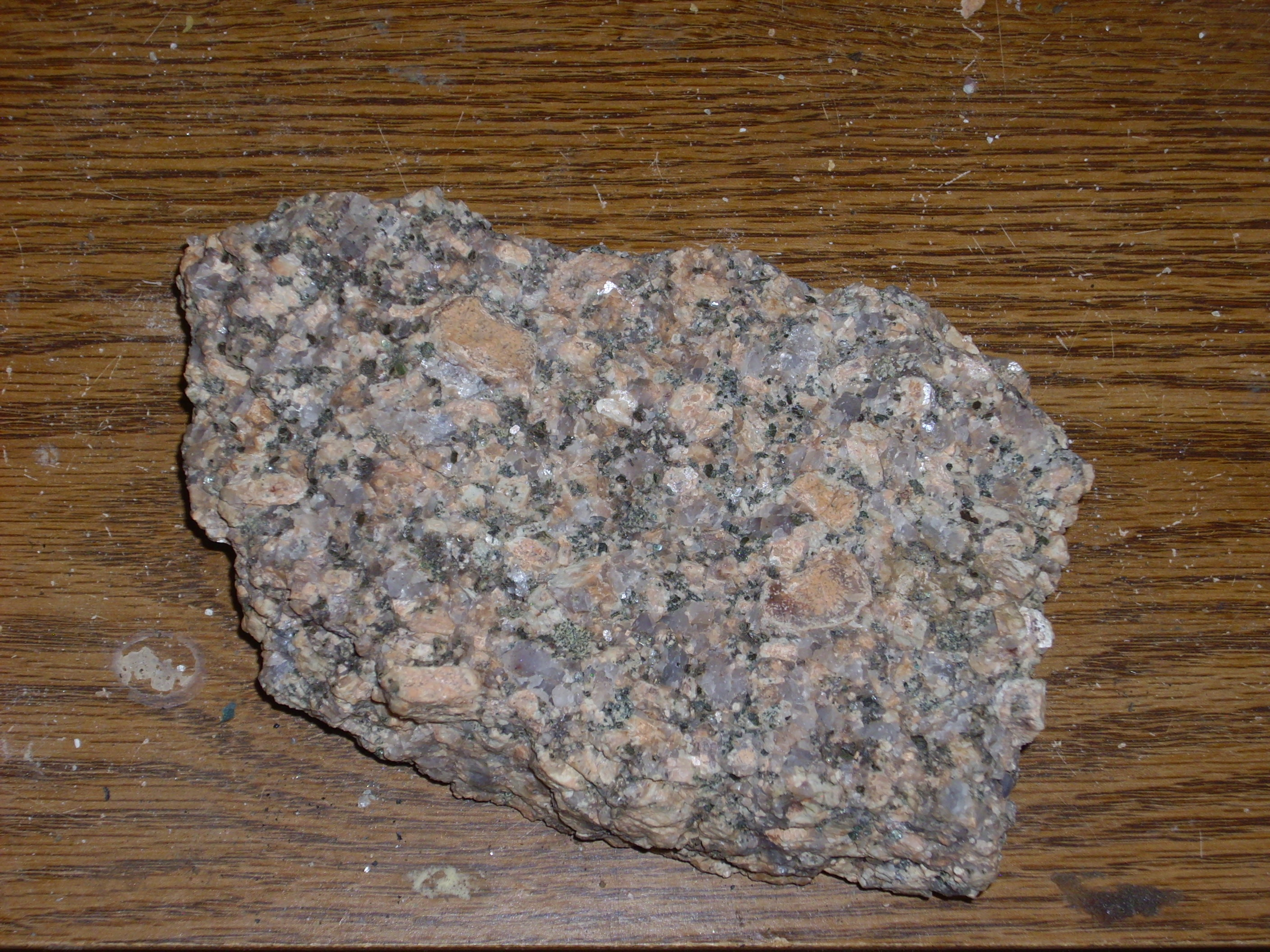
Sample of San Pedro quartz monzonite showing rapakivi texture

The San Pedro quartz monzonite contains euhedral to anhedral pink megacrysts of microcline with a maximum size of 1.5 cm. The ground mass is blue-gray quartz, additional pink microcline, greenish-gray sodium-rich plagioclase, and minor biotite. In some locations, the microcline megacrysts show mantles of sodic plagioclase typical of rapakivi. The radiometric age is 1730 Mya based on U-Pb dating and the normative composition is given as 31.20% quartz, 21.00% orthoclase, 29.17% albite, 10.71% anorthite, 3.30% hypersthene, 1.58% magnetite, 0.60% ilmenite, and 0.26% apatite. The pluton crops out in the San Pedro Mountains of northern New Mexico, a region of numerous overlapping plutons emplaced in metasedimentary and metavolcanic beds that may correlate with the Vadito Group.

The pluton grades on the north into tonalite, and the gradation has been interpreted as assimilation and metasomatization of the presumably older tonalite. The southern part of the pluton shows east-northeast shearing of the Nacimiento Creek Shear Zone. This has been interpreted as the boundary of the Yavapai crustal province with the Mazatzal crustal province, but Hf isotope ratios and zircon dates from the southern Sierra Nacimento Mountains suggest the boundary is south of the Sierra Nacimiento.

== History of investigation ==
The quartz monzonite was first described in Woodward et al. as part of their survey of the Precambrian rocks of the northern Nacimiento Mountains of New Mexico in 1977.
