= San Miguel gneiss =

Plutonic rock found in New Mexico, US

- Stratigraphic range: Statherian
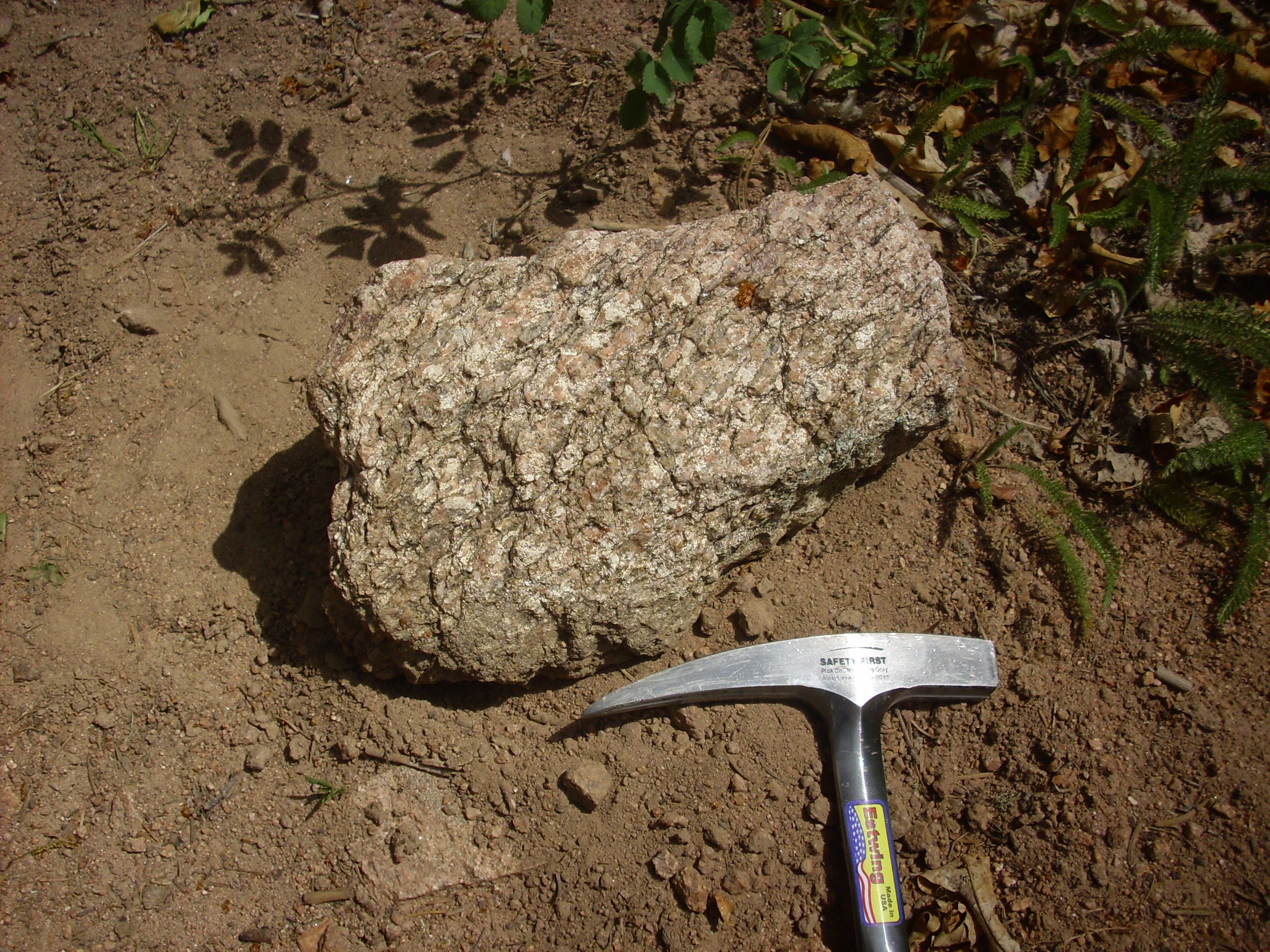
- Sample of San Miguel gneiss
- Type: Pluton

Lithology
- Primary: Orthogneiss

Location
- Coordinates: 35.866°N 106.875°W
- Region: Nacimiento Mountains, New Mexico
- Country: United States

Type section
- Named for: San Miguel Mountain, New Mexico (35.866°N 106.875°W)
- Named by: Woodward
- Year defined: 1974
- San Miguel gneiss (the United States) San Miguel gneiss (New Mexico)

The San Miguel gneiss is a Paleoproterozoic pluton in the Nacimiento Mountains of New Mexico. It has a radiometric age of 1.695 billion years, corresponding to the Statherian period.

== Description ==
The San Miguel Gneiss is a quartz monzonitic to granodioritic gneiss. It ranges in color from salmon-pink to light pinkish-gray and in texture from fine- to coarse-grained. Foliation is lenticular and trends northeast. The modal composition is 16 to 32 percent microcline, 29 to 36 percent plagioclase (An27-33), 25 to 30 percent quartz, 2 to 9 percent biotite, and with accessory opaque minerals, muscovite, chlorite, and myrmekite. There are also traces of zircon, apatite, sphene, epidote, and sericite are present. Some of the plagioclase takes the form of subhedral megacrysts up to 5 mm across. Metamorphism may have reached the amphibolite metamorphic facies.

The unit is the dominant unit in the central Nacimiento Mountains. This range is underlain by numerous overlapping plutons emplaced in metasedimentary and metavolcanic beds that may correlate with the Vadito Group. The San Miguel gneiss itself may correlate with the Tres Piedras Orthogneiss in the Tusas Mountains.

The pluton contains apparent roof pendants of amphibolite or leucogranite. It is intruded by the Joaquin quartz monzonite.

== History of investigation ==
The gneiss was named by Woodward et al. in 1974 as part of their survey of Precambrian rocks in the southern Nacimiento Mountains.
