= Joaquin quartz monzonite =

Mesoproterozoic pluton in New Mexico, U.S.

- Stratigraphic range: Calymmian
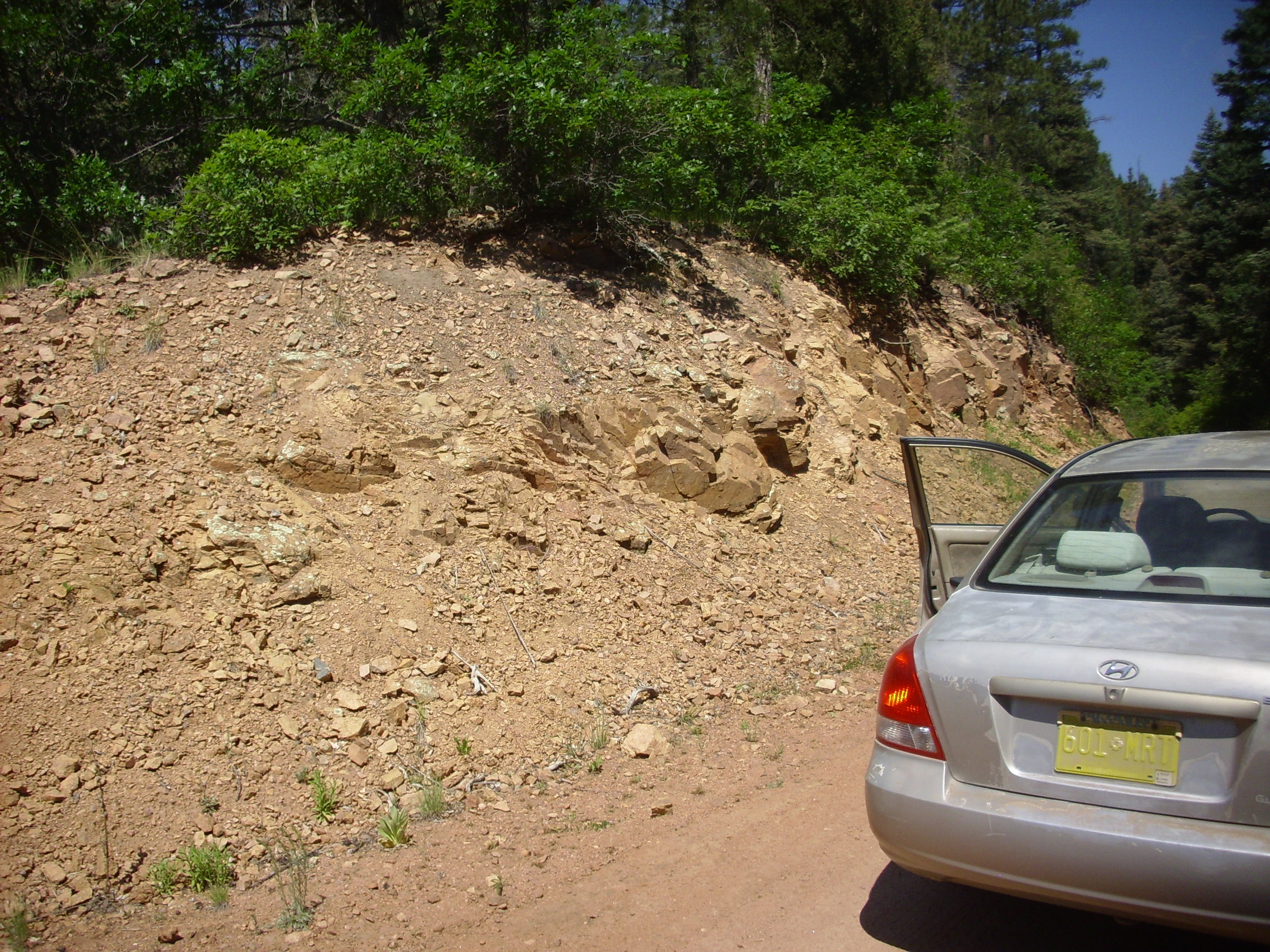
- Exposure of Joaquin quartz monzonite in road cut
- Type: Pluton

Lithology
- Primary: Quartz monzonite

Location
- Coordinates: 35.778°N 106.875°W
- Region: Nacimiento Mountains, New Mexico
- Country: United States

Type section
- Named for: Joaquin Canyon, New Mexico (35.778°N 106.875°W)
- Named by: Woodward
- Year defined: 1974
- Joaquin quartz monzonite (the United States) Joaquin quartz monzonite (New Mexico)

The Joaquin quartz monzonite is a Mesoproterozoic pluton in northern New Mexico. Radiometric dating gives it an age of 1460 million years, corresponding to the Calymmian period.

== Description ==
The unit is a pink fine- to medium-grained rock with microcline megacrysts in some locations. It is subtly foliated in some locations, particularly to the south. The lithology was originally assessed as granitic with some quartz monzonite. The modal composition is 40 to 50 percent microcline-microperthite, 18 to 21 percent plagioclase (An24), 24 to 37 percent quartz, 2 to 3 percent biotite, and 1 percent muscovite. Present as accessories are opaque minerals, chlorite, sericite, myrmekite apatite, sphene, zircon, and epidote. Microcline crystals are typically 0.5 to 1.0 mm across.

The pluton crops out in the Nacimiento Mountains of northern New Mexico, a region of numerous overlapping plutons emplaced in metasedimentary and metavolcanic beds that may correlate with the Vadito Group. It is the most widespread formation in the southern Nacimiento Mountains.

Margins with the San Miguel gneiss to the north are sharp and chilled, with dikes extending into the gneiss and roof pendants of gneiss in the quartz monzonite. There are indications the pluton was emplaced as a magma and that stoping and assimilation were important in accommodation.

== History of investigation ==
The unit was first described as the Joaquin Granite by Woodward et al. in their 1974 survey of the Precambrian rocks of the southern Nacimiento Mountains. It was named for exposures in Joaquin Canyon (35.778°N 106.875°W) However, Karlstrom et al. referred to it as the Joaquin quartz monzonite in a review article in 2004 and it is again so named in a 2015 paper by Grambling et al..
