= Tres Piedras Orthogneiss =

Plutonic rock found in New Mexico, US

- Stratigraphic range: Statherian
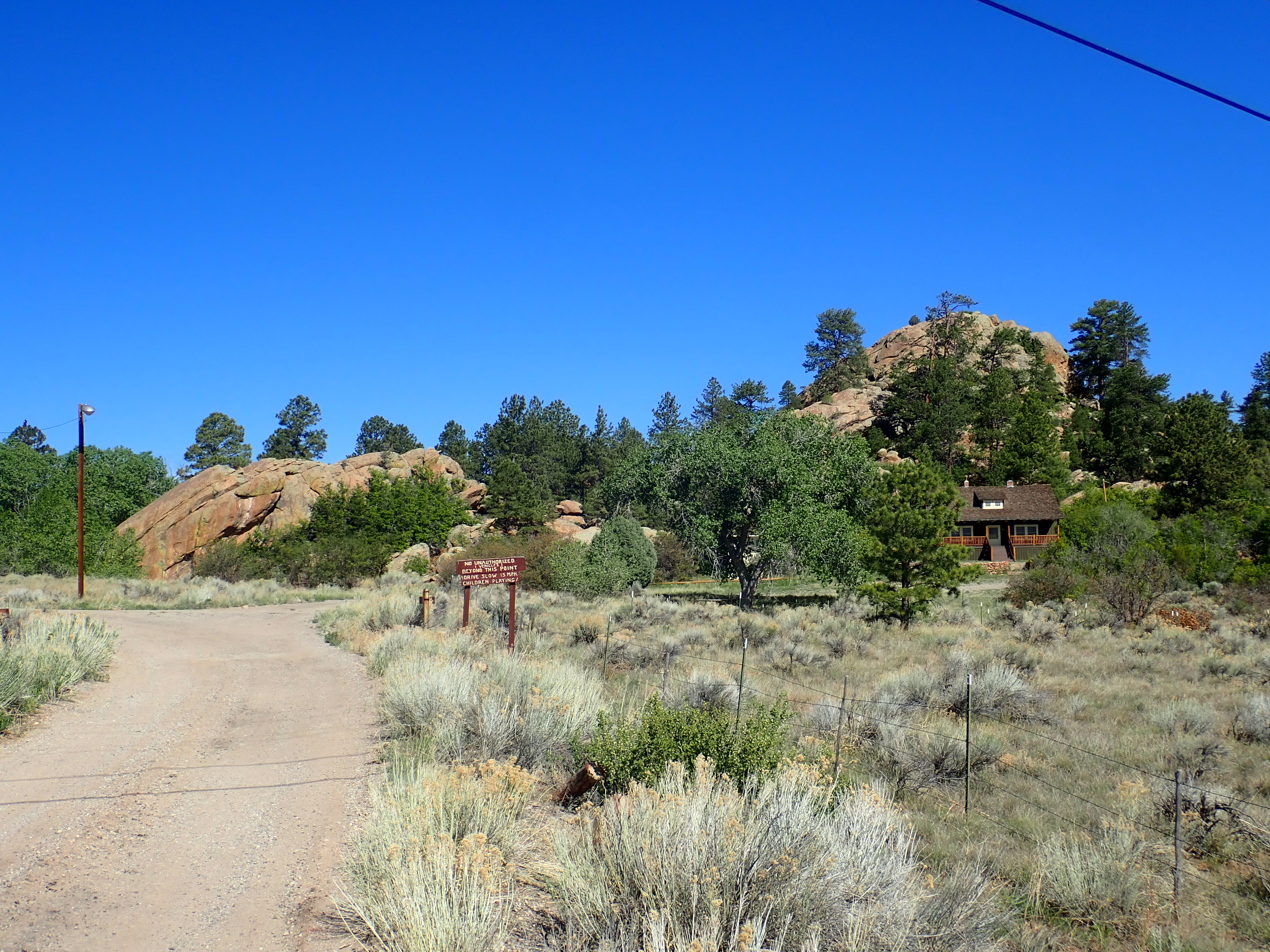
- Knolls underlain by Tres Piedras Orthogneiss, Tres Piedras, New Mexico, USA
- Type: Pluton

Lithology
- Primary: Orthogneiss

Location
- Coordinates: 36.649°N 105.990°W
- Region: Tusas Mountains, New Mexico
- Country: United States

Type section
- Named for: Tres Piedras, New Mexico
- Named by: F. Barker
- Year defined: 1958
- Tres Piedras Orthogneiss (the United States) Tres Piedras Orthogneiss (New Mexico)

The Tres Piedras Orthogneiss is a pluton in northern New Mexico. It has a U-Pb radiometric age of 1693 Mya, placing it in the Statherian period.

== Description ==
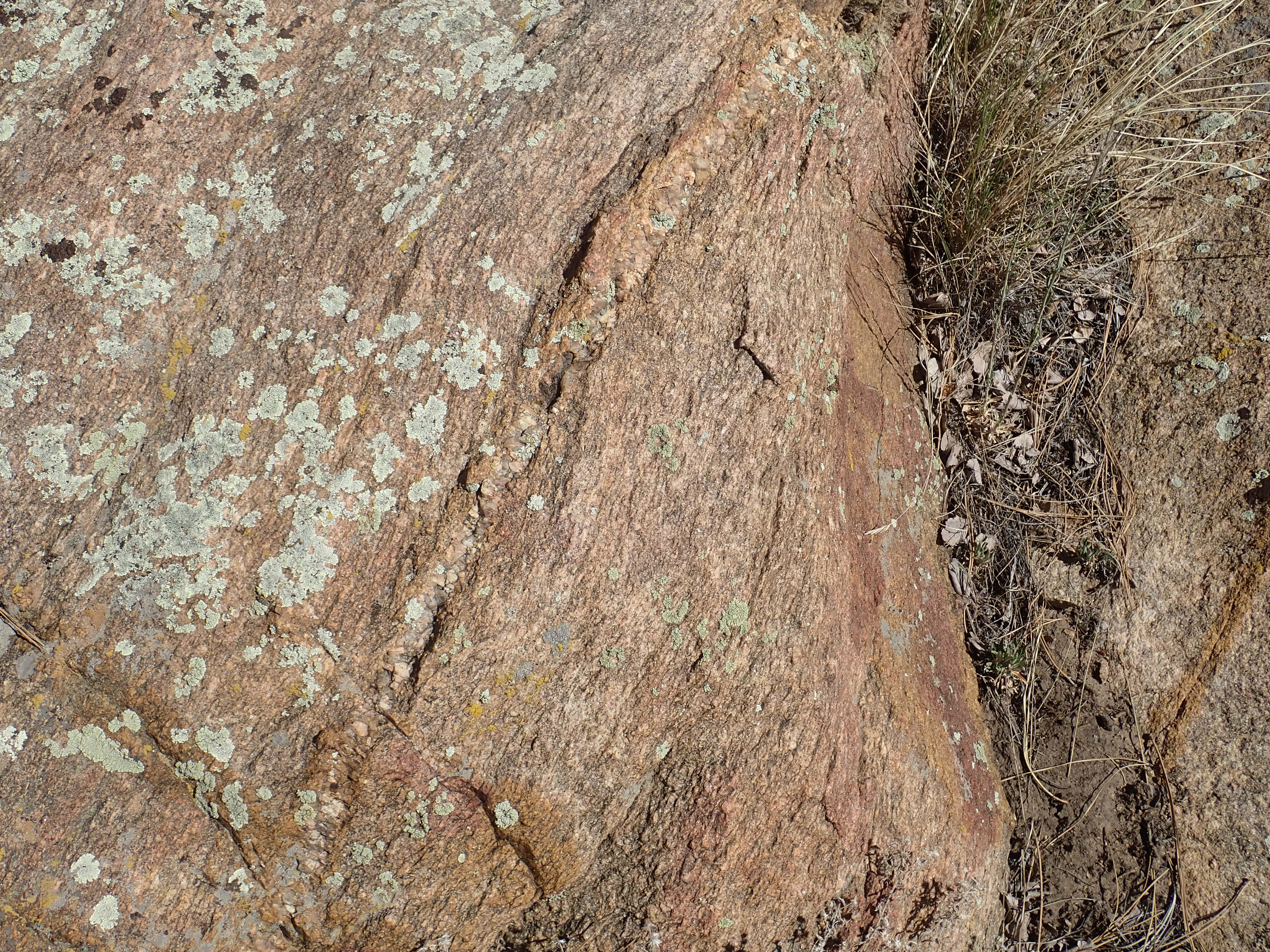
Tres Piedras Orthogneiss

Though described as the Tres Piedras Granite in the earlier studies, the unit is more properly described as an orthogneiss. The orthogneiss is pink to reddish-orange and shows faint to obvious foliation. Grain sizes are from 0.5 to 5 mm. Many of the quartz grains are fractured. With a modal composition of 42% quartz, 40% microcline, and 12% albite, it has the composition of an alkali feldspar granite. It has no contact metamorphism with the Moppin Complex, suggesting the country rock was only slightly cooler when the granite was injected.

The orthogneiss crops out around the town of Tres Piedras, New Mexico and intrudes the Moppin Complex to the west in the Tusas Mountains. It may correlate with the San Miguel gneiss in the Nacimiento Mountains.

The pluton is interpreted as possibly a magma chamber associated with Vadito Group volcanism or a stitching pluton associated with the Yavapai-Mazatzal orogenies.

== History of investigation ==
The unit was originally included in the Tusas Granite by Just in his 1937 survey of pegmatites in northern New Mexico. but was designated as the Tres Piedras Granite by Barker in 1958. Barker included exposures near the town of Tres Piedras, along the Rio Tusas, and near Burned Mountain and Hopewell. Wobus and Hedge removed the western outcrops from the pluton based on an unreliable radiometric date, but Davis et al. concluded that the Tusas Mountain orthgneiss is likely part of the Tres Piedras Orthogneiss.
