= El Rito Formation =

Geologic formation in New Mexico, USA

- Stratigraphic range: Eocene
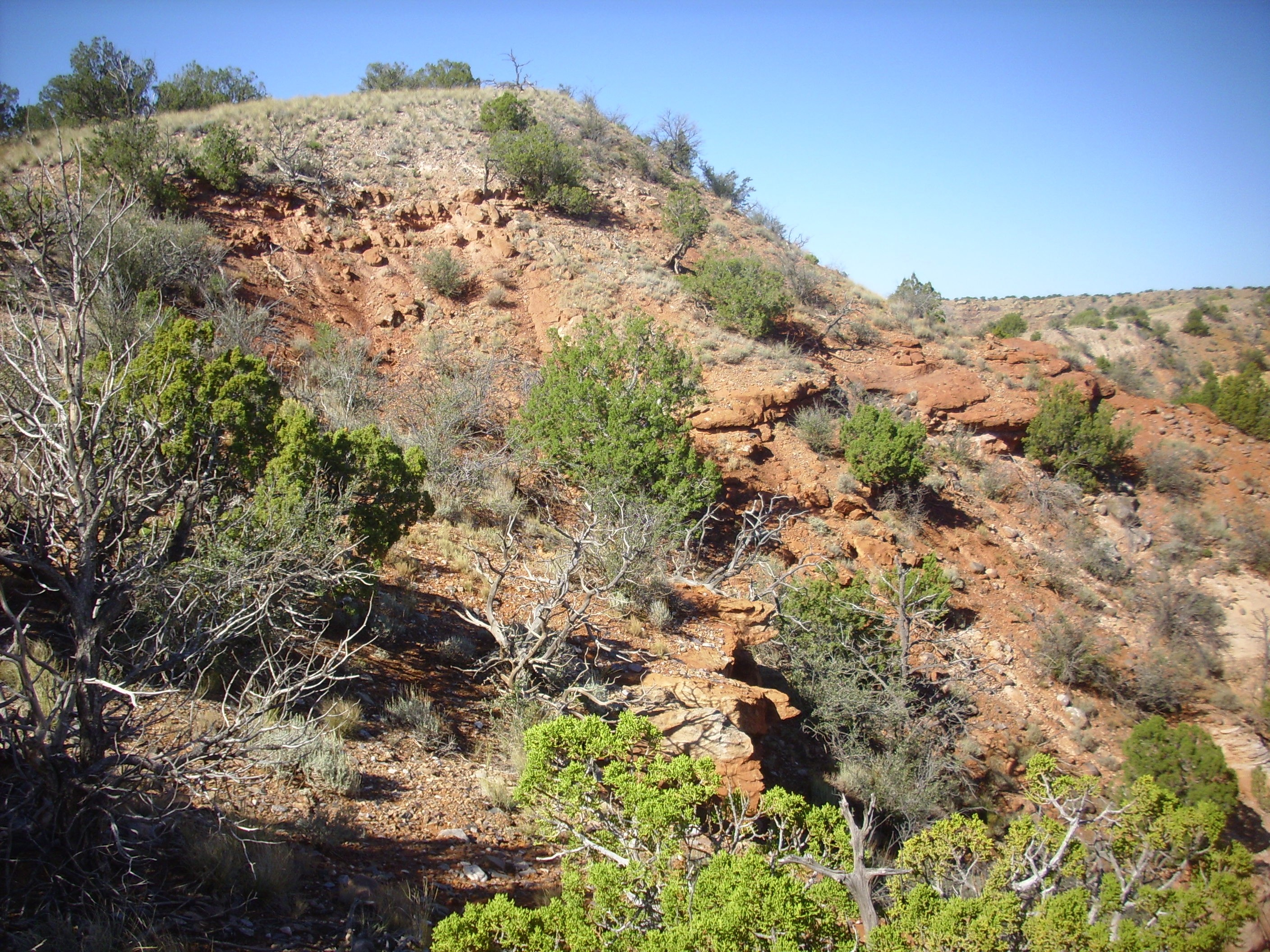
- El Rito Formation near Arroyo del Cobre, New Mexico
- Type: Formation
- Underlies: Ritito Conglomerate
- Overlies: Morrison Formation, Dakota Formation
- Thickness: 70 m (230 ft)

Lithology
- Primary: Sandstone
- Other: Mudstone

Location
- Coordinates: 36.276°N 106.302°W
- Region: New Mexico
- Country: United States

Type section
- Named for: El Rito Creek
- Named by: H.T.U. Smith
- Year defined: 1938
- El Rito Formation (the United States) El Rito Formation (New Mexico)

The El Rito Formation is a geologic formation in New Mexico dating to the Eocene epoch. It records a time when sediments were trapped in deep basins in western North America rather than being carried downstream to the Gulf of Mexico, so that sediments of this age in the western Gulf are mostly from the Appalachian Mountains.

== Description ==
The formation is composed of brick-red well-consolidated sandstone, conglomerate, and breccia. The pebbles are predominantly quartzite, with no volcaniclastics. The formation crops out over a narrow belt from the southern Tusas Mountains to upper Coyote Creek. In the southern Tusas Mountains, it fills narrow paleovalleys eroded in basement quartzite. Further south, the rock grades from heterogeneous breccia to a poorly sorted conglomerate. The breccia is interpreted as regolith and talus, while the conglomerate is interpreted as a high-energy stream deposit. The distinctive red color is found penetrating joints in the underlying quartzite to depths of several meters. Further south and west, the formation transitions to lighter-colored sandstone. Maximum thickness is 70 meters (230 feet). A characteristic feature of the sandstone is its content of muscovite flakes.

The base of the formation is an angular unconformity with much older beds of Jurassic to Cretaceous age, while the upper contact is an erosional disconformity with the Abiquiu Formation.

Its age is uncertain due to an almost complete lack of fossils. However, the formation was deposited in the waning phase of the Laramide orogeny under arid conditions. Paleocurrents and conglomerate clast provenance show that the source region was the Brazos uplift to the north and northeast. The formation was deposited in an asymmetrical basin formed in response to tectonic compression of the Laramide orogeny, truncated to the west along the Canones fault zone.

The El Rito basin likely was continuous with the Galisteo Basin before the opening of the Rio Grande rift separated the two basins starting in the Miocene. It has also long been believed that the El Rito Formation correlates with the Diamond Tail and Galisteo Formations. However, although the two sets of formations rest on what is likely the same erosional surface, the El Rito Formation was deposited in eroded channels while the Galisteo and Diamond Tail Formations were deposited in an area of tectonic subsidence. Detrital zircon geochronology suggests that the Diamond Tail and Galisteo Formations were deposited first, and only after the southern part of the basin was filled with sediments did sediments begin to accumulate in the northern El Rito portion of the basin. Because sediments were accumulating in deep basins like the El Rito/Galisteo Basin in the middle Eocene, rather than being transported further downstream, the Gulf of Mexico was starved of sediment sources from the northwest. Sediments from the Appalachians were deposited in the western Gulf of Mexico instead.

== History of investigation ==
The formation was named in 1938 by Harold T.U. Smith for exposures along El Rito Creek.
