= Hinsdale Formation =

Geologic formation in New Mexico, USA

- Stratigraphic range: Neogene; 26.8–4.4 Ma
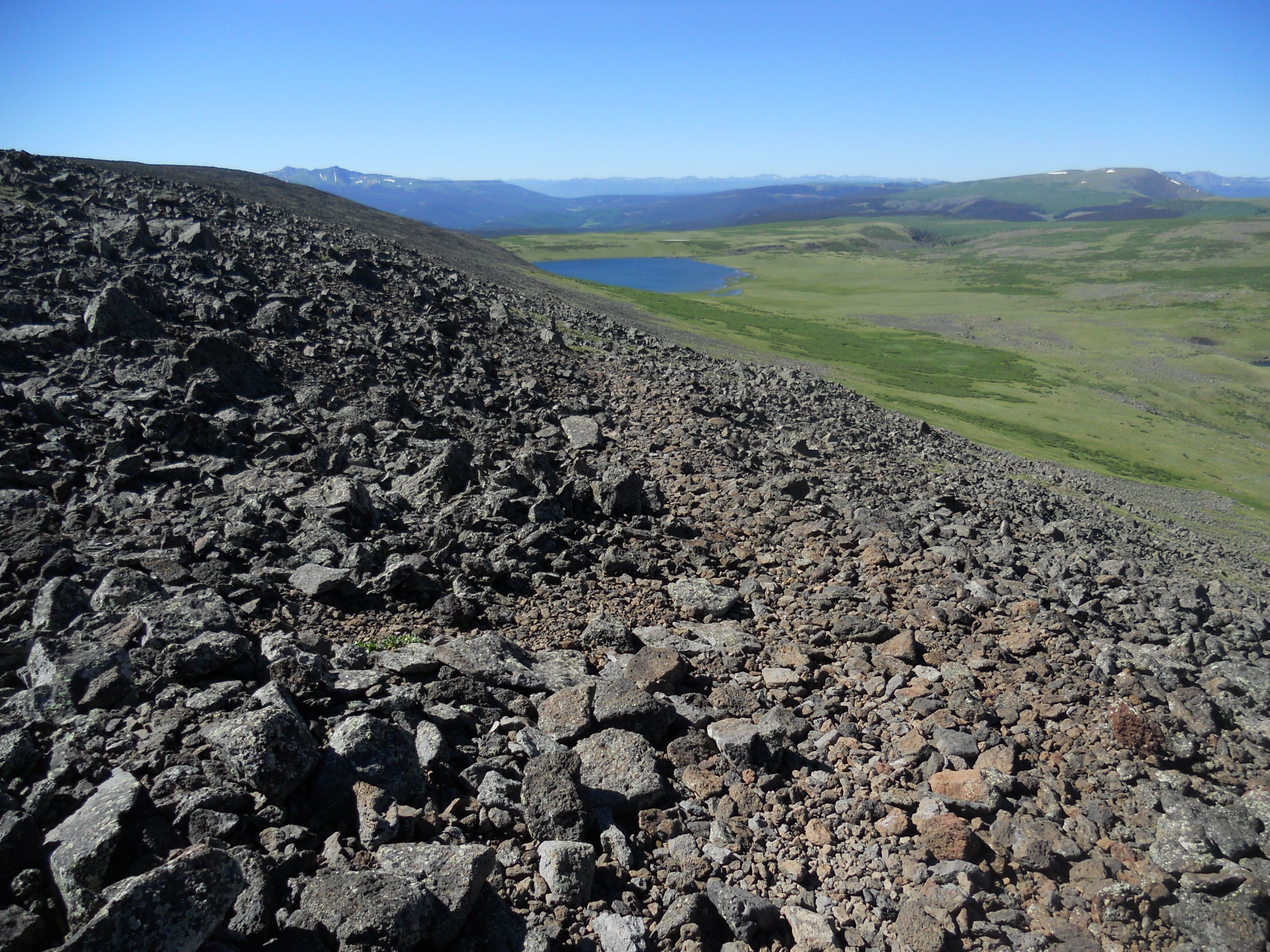
- Hinsdale Formation at its type locality in Colorado (Devils Lake, Powderhorn Wilderness)
- Type: Formation
- Overlies: Los Pinos Formation
- Thickness: 1,200 ft (370 m)

Lithology
- Primary: Basalt, andesite, rhyolite

Location
- Coordinates: 37.787°N 107.319°W
- Region: Colorado; New Mexico
- Country: United States

Type section
- Named for: Hinsdale County, Colorado
- Named by: Charles Whitman Cross
- Year defined: 1911
- Hinsdale Formation (the United States) Hinsdale Formation (Colorado)

The Hinsdale Formation is a geologic formation exposed in southwestern Colorado and northern New Mexico. It has a radiometric age of 4.4 to 26.8 million years, corresponding to the Neogene period.

== Description ==
The Hinsdale Formation is a bimodal volcanic formation, containing silica-poor olivine basalt and high-silica rhyolite with only small quantities of volcanic rock of intermediate composition. The sequence reflects assimilation and fractional crystallization (AFC) of a primitive basalt magma. Total thickness is in excess of 1,200 feet (370 m).

The formation is the youngest volcanic formation of the San Juan volcanic field, and is separated from older units by a significant erosional surface. Radiometric ages range from 4.4 to 26.8 million years. The formation once formed an extensive thin veneer over the San Juan volcanic field before itself being eroded.

The change to bimodal association coincided with the transition from Laramide compression to Rio Grande rift extension, a pattern seen elsewhere in the western United States.

== Economic geology ==
The rich mineralization of the San Juan Volcanic Field has been attributed to early intrusions of the Hinsdale Formation.

== History of investigation ==
The formation was first named the Hinsdale Volcanic Series by Charles Whitman Cross in 1911 for exposures in Hinsdale County, Colorado. Larsen redefined the unit as the Hinsdale Formation and included the Los Pinos Member. Barker removed the Los Pinos as its own formation in 1958.
