= Amalia Tuff =

Geologic formation in New Mexico, USA

- Stratigraphic range: Oligocene; 25.35–25.43 Ma
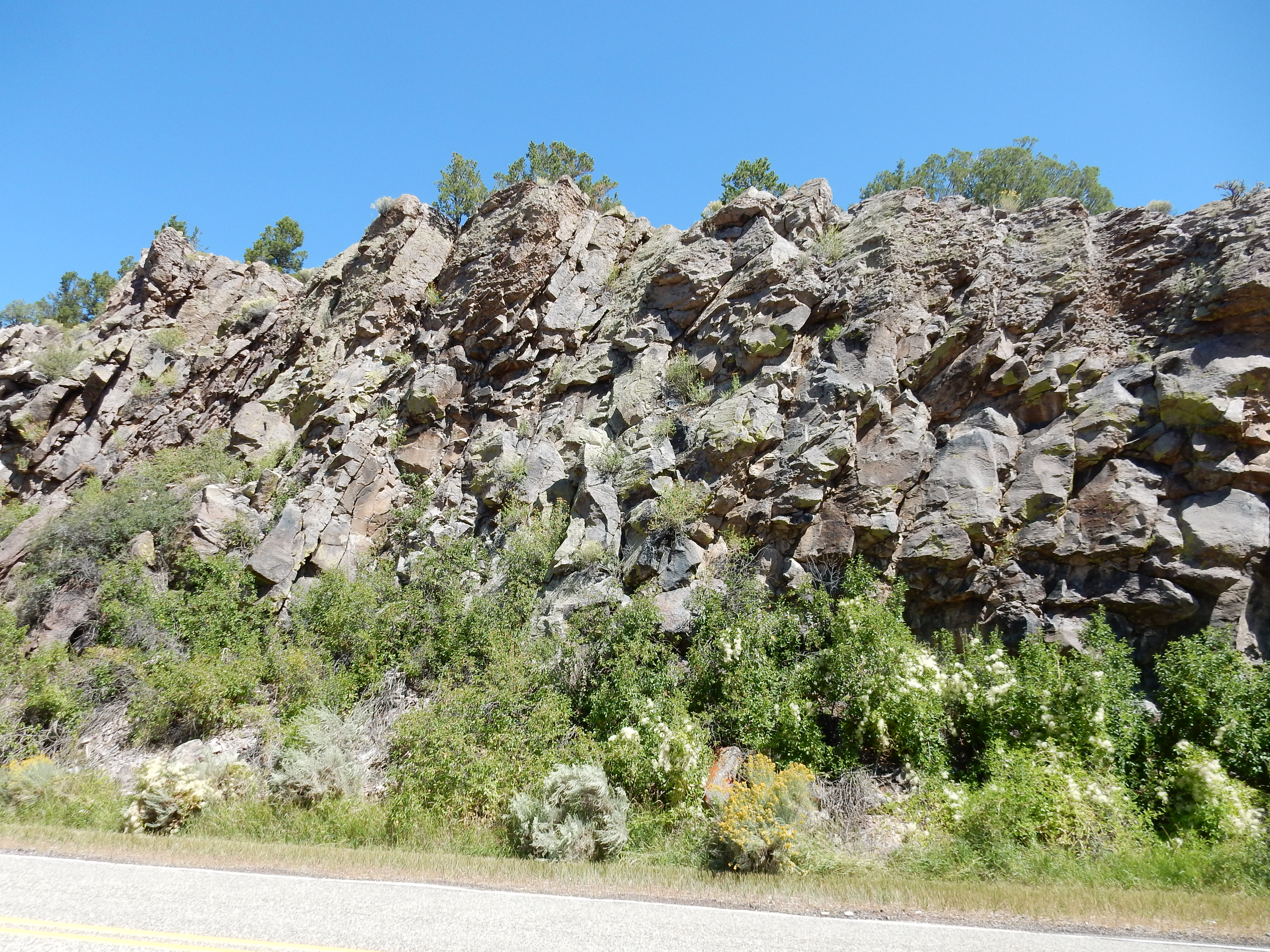
- Amalia Tuff at its type area, near Amalia, New Mexico
- Type: Geologic formation
- Thickness: 2,500 m (8,200 ft)

Lithology
- Primary: Ignimbrite

Location
- Coordinates: 36°56′45″N 105°27′45″W
- Region: New Mexico
- Country: United States

Type section
- Named for: Amalia Post Office
- Named by: P.F. McKinlay
- Year defined: 1956
- Amalia Tuff (the United States) Amalia Tuff (New Mexico)

The Amalia Tuff is a geologic formation exposed in and around Questa, New Mexico. It has a radiometric age of 25.39 ± 0.04 million years, corresponding to the Oligocene epoch.

== Description ==
The Amalia Tuff is a weakly to densely welded ash-flow tuff erupted during the formation of the Questa caldera 25.39 ± 0.04 million years ago (Ma), which erupted some 500–1,000 cubic kilometers (120–240 cu mi) of magma. It originally formed an outflow sheet 20–50 meters (66–164 feet) thick that extended as far as 45 kilometers (28 miles) to the southwest and 25 kilometers (16 miles) to the northeast. Within the caldera the tuff pooled to a depth of 1,000–2,000 meters (3,300–6,600 feet). The tuff appears to be a single cooling unit.

The tuff is silicic and alkaline, though its silica content of 77–80% likely reflects some secondary silicification. It contains 10–20% quartz and alkali feldspar phenocrysts. Rare occurrences of a vitrophyric tuff at the base of the main bed contain ferrohedenbergite and fayalite, while the upper beds sometimes preserve sodic amphibole phenocrysts. The intracaldera tuff contains lenticular megabreccia blocks up to 1,000 meters (0.62 miles) across. The tuff includes a lithic-rich lower facies that is nonwelded to partially welded and up to 30 meters (98 feet) thick. This contains up to 5% andesite and sparse Proterozoic rock fragments. This grades into the main bed of the formation.

Ar-Ar dating of the tuffs and associated plutons indicates the magma that formed the tuff was not generated in place in the upper crust. Isotope evidence suggests the original basaltic magma assimilated considerable crust material and underwent crystal fractionation at a deeper level of the crust than that of the magma chamber responsible for the Questa eruption.

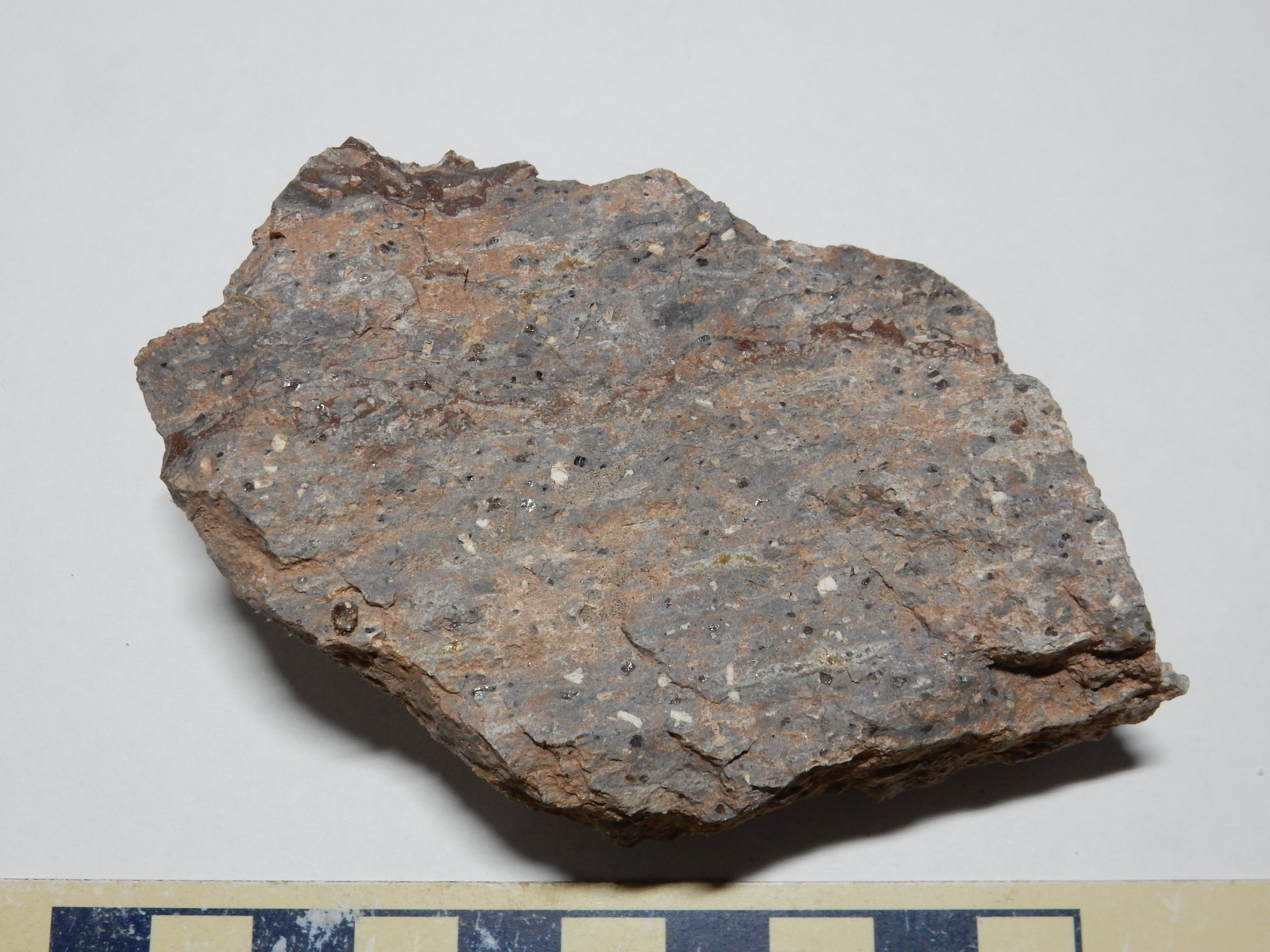
Sample of Amalia Tuff from the type area, Amalia, New Mexico

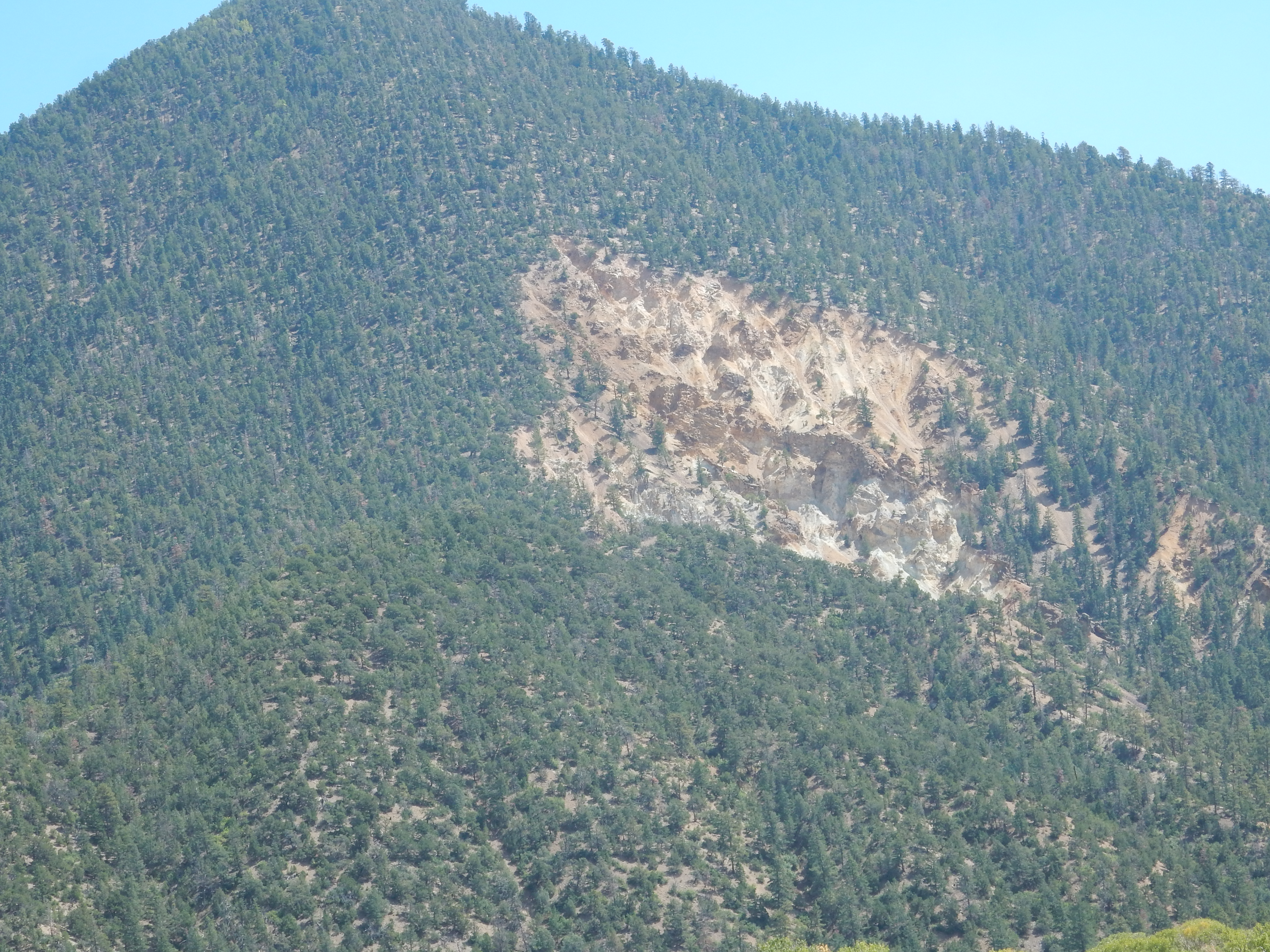
Exposure of intracaldera Amalia Tuff at mouth of Cabresto Canyon

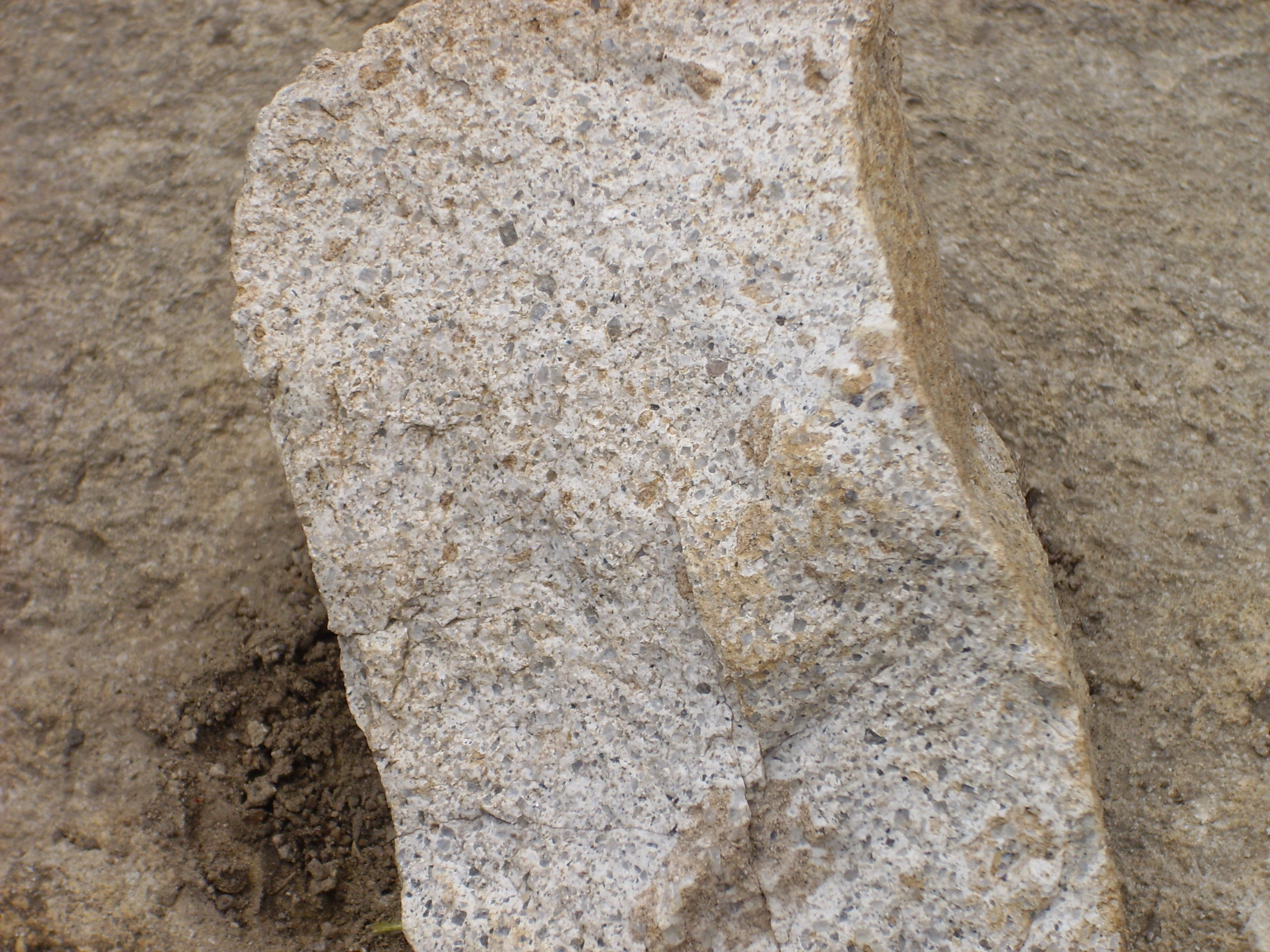
A fragment of Amalia Tuff from an outcropping near Petaca, New Mexico

== History of investigation ==
The unit was first designated the Amalia Formation in 1956 by P.F. McKinlay. As originally defined, it included basalt flows and sedimentary beds dating from before the Questa eruption. These were removed from the unit definition by Lipman in 1983, who restricted the unit to the densely welded tuff outflow sheet from the Questa eruption and renamed the unit the Amalia Tuff.
