= Ritito Conglomerate =

Geologic formation in New Mexico

- Stratigraphic range: Oligocene; 25–27 Ma
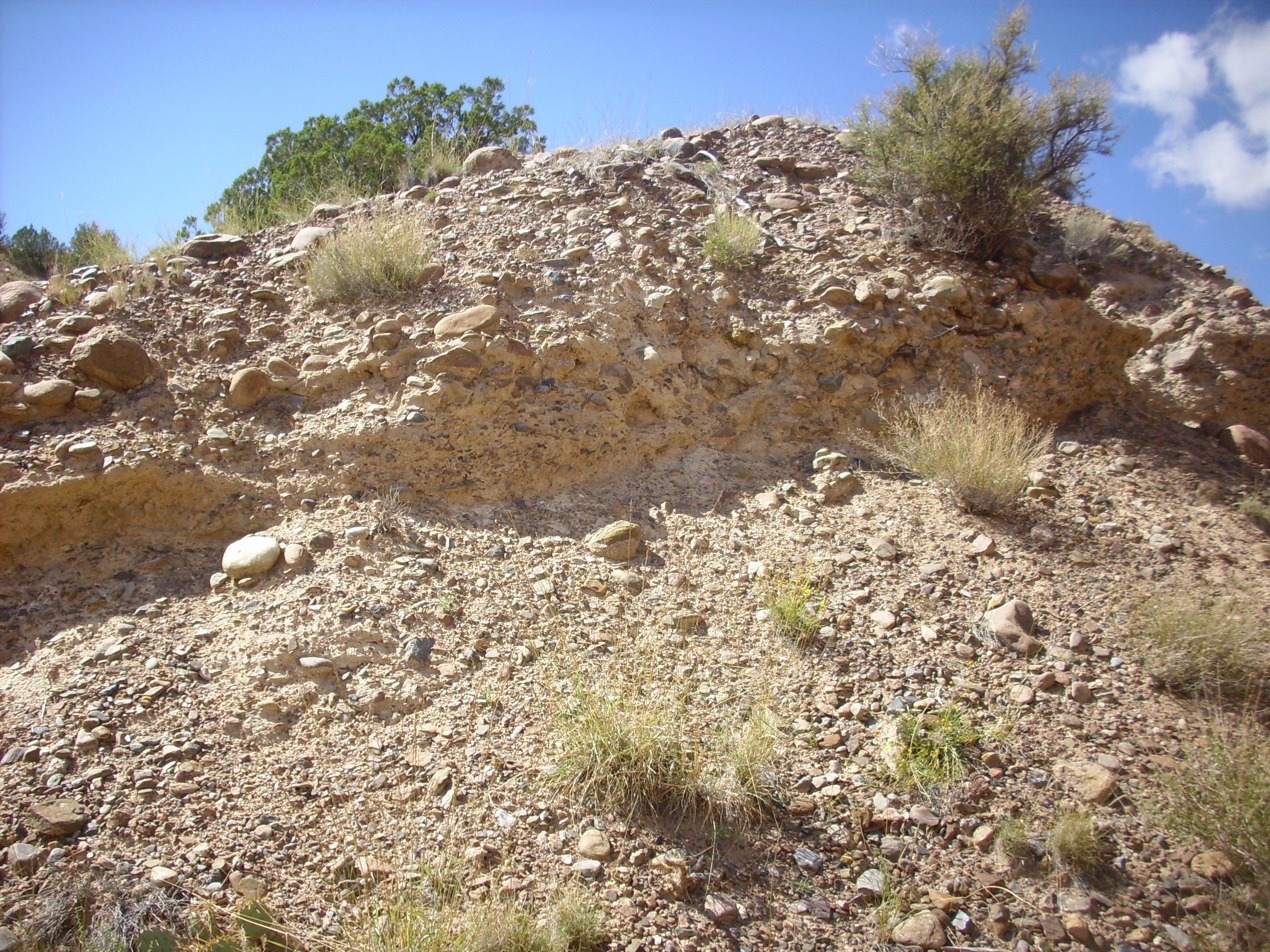
- Ritito Conglomerate at Red Wash, New Mexico
- Type: Formation
- Underlies: Abiquiu Formation
- Overlies: El Rito Formation
- Thickness: 210 meters (690 feet)

Lithology
- Primary: Conglomerate
- Other: Siltstone

Location
- Coordinates: 36.581°N 106.167°W
- Region: New Mexico
- Country: United States

Type section
- Named for: Ritito Canyon
- Named by: F. Barker
- Year defined: 1958
- Ritito Conglomerate (the United States) Ritito Conglomerate (New Mexico)

The Ritito Conglomerate is a geologic formation in northern New Mexico dating to the Oligocene epoch.

== Description ==
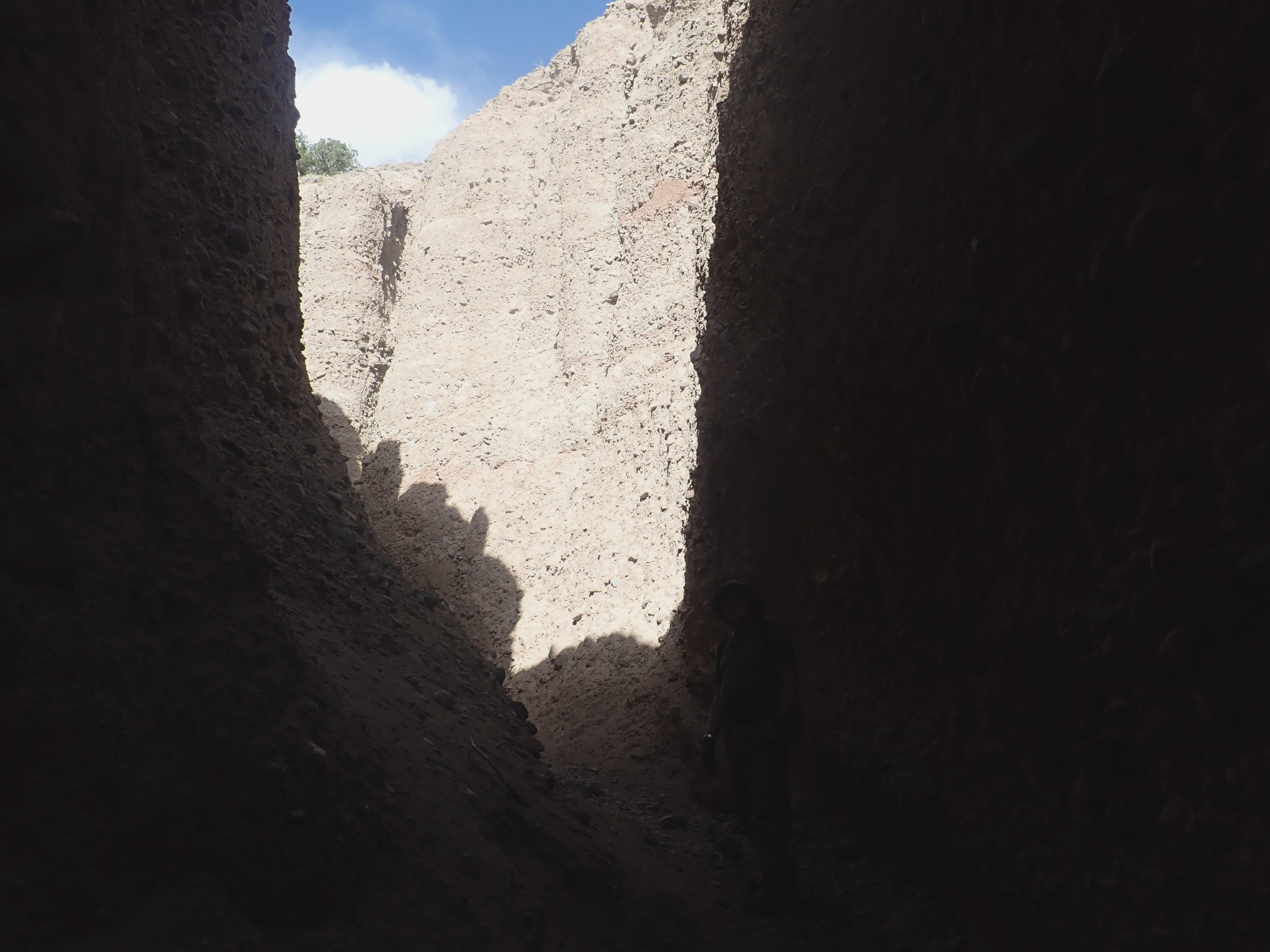
Slot canyon eroded in the Ritito Conglomerate west of Abiquiu, New Mexico

The formation is composed of orange-pink to reddish-brown arkosic conglomerate, sandstone, and siltstone with muscovite. The matrix is gray to tan except near Abiquiu, where it has a distinct red-brown color. Clasts are angular to well-rounded and are mostly of pebble size, but range from granules to boulders. The clasts are 44% Proterozoic quartzite, with 25% granite, 13% metavolcanic rock, 10% quartz, 5% schist, and 3% gneiss, with traces of chert and Phanerozoic sandstone. Some of the clasts have been identified as reddish-brown quartzite from the Cerro Colorado area or quartzite of the Ortega Formation. Imbrication indicates deposition in a meandering southward-flowing river system.

The formation crops out in a broad area between the northern Jemez Mountains, the southeastern flank of the Tusas Mountains, and the eastern flank of the Nacimiento Mountains. Maximum thickness is 210 meters (690 ft).

The formation rests unconformably on the El Rito Formation and has a gradational contact with the overlying Abiquiu Formation. The transition zone is characterized by chert beds assigned informally to the Pedernal chert. These are interpreted as calcic paleosols replaced by silica, possibly in a hydrothermal setting.

The age of the bulk of the formation is estimated as 25 to possibly more than 27 million years.

== History of investigation ==
The formation was named in 1958 by Fred Barker for exposures along Ritito Canyon, El Rito Creek (36.581°N 106.167°W). Exposures further to the south were long described as the lower Abiquiu Formation, but Florian Maldonado and Shari Kelley reassigned these to the Ritito Conglomerate in 2009.
