= Abiquiu Formation =

Geologic formation in New Mexico, USA

- Stratigraphic range: Oligocene to Miocene; 25–18.9 Ma
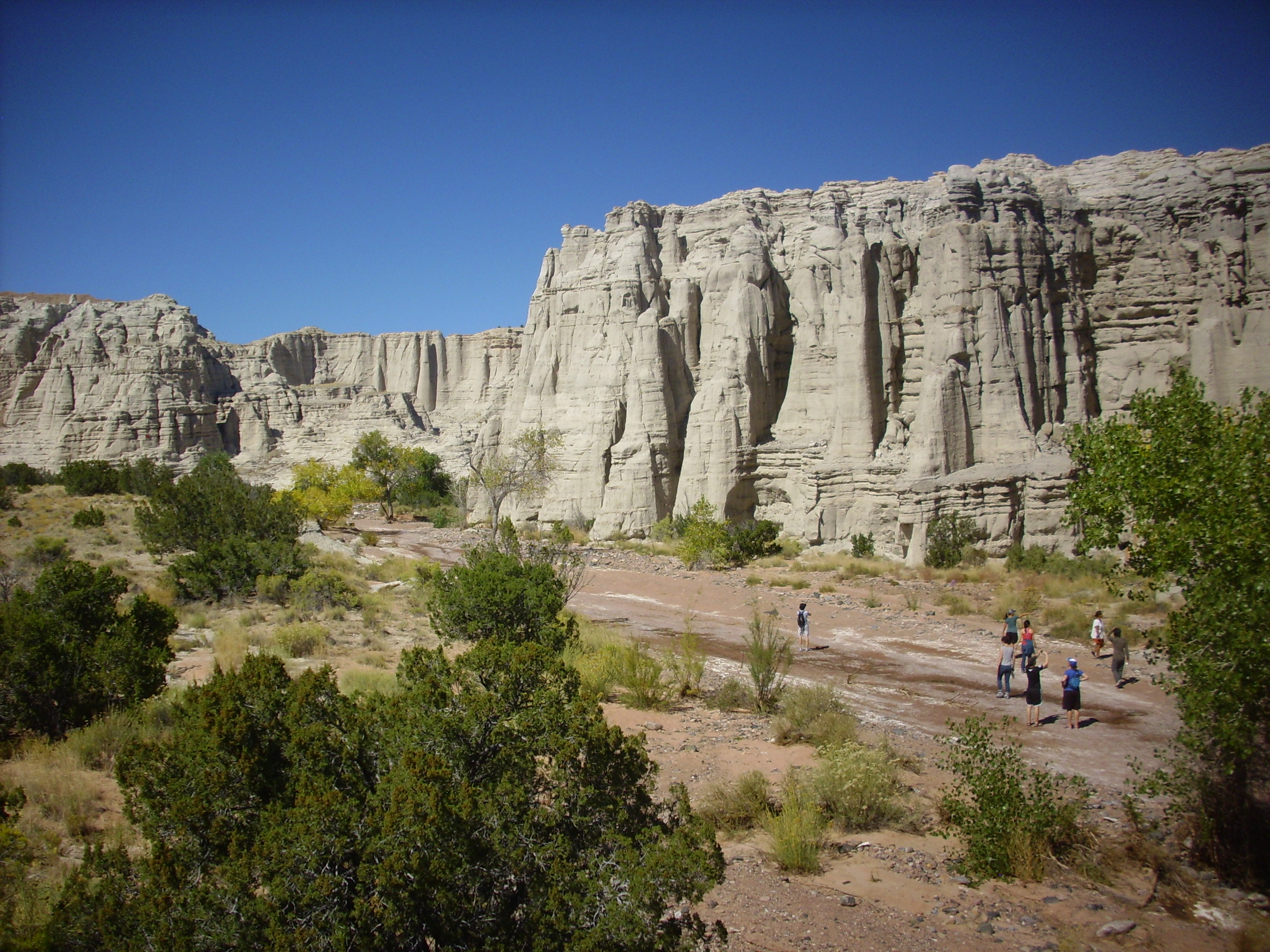
- Abiquiu Formation at Plaza Blanca, north of Abiquiu, New Mexico
- Type: Formation
- Unit of: Santa Fe Group
- Sub-units: Pedernal Chert
- Underlies: Tesuque Formation
- Overlies: El Rito Formation
- Thickness: 400 m (1,300 ft)

Lithology
- Primary: Sandstone, siltstone
- Other: conglomerate, mudstone

Location
- Coordinates: 36.240°N 106.298°W
- Region: New Mexico
- Country: United States

Type section
- Named for: Abiquiu, New Mexico
- Named by: H.T.U. Smith
- Year defined: 1938
- Abiquiu Formation (the United States) Abiquiu Formation (New Mexico)

From the White Place, painting by Georgia O'Keeffe depicting the Abiquiu Formation

The Abiquiu Formation is a geologic formation found in northern New Mexico. Radiometric dating constrains its age to between 18 million and 27 million years, corresponding to the late Oligocene to Miocene epochs.

The formation is composed mostly of volcanic debris from the Latir volcanic field, and records the early stages of the opening of the Rio Grande rift in northern New Mexico.

Artist Georgia O'Keeffe drew inspiration from her study of the formation at Plaza Blanca.

== Description ==
The Abiquiu Formation consists of light-gray to yellowish-gray, locally crossbedded, thin to thick beds of tuffaceous sandstone, pebbly sandstone, and siltstone. There are also a few gravel beds and lenses of mudstone. The clasts are mostly of volcanic rock, including Amalia Tuff and trachyandesite and trachydacite possibly also from the Latir volcanic field. The formation is exposed in a broad belt from the southwest flank of the Tusas Mountains to the Jarosa area in the northwest Jemez Mountains. The formation reaches a maximum thickness in excess of 400 meters (1,300 feet) near Cañones. The age of the formation is approximately bracketed by a lava flow near its top dated to 18.9 Ma and a 25 Ma flow near its base.

Both the lower contact of the formation with the Ritito Conglomerate and the upper contact with the Chama-El Rito Member of the Tesuque Formation are gradational. The transition to the Ritito Conglomerate is characterized by thick chert beds, informally designated the Pedernal chert for outcrops around Cerro Pedernal (36.163°N 106.512°W).

Individual beds in the formation thicken across the Canones fault zone, which separates the Colorado Plateau from the Rio Grande rift. This indicates that the formation was deposited after rifting began within the Rio Grande rift.

The formation correlates with the Cordito Member of the Los Pinos Formation. It can be divided into three intervals based on the source of its sediments. The first interval derives its sediments from basement rock of the Tusas Mountains and from the San Juan volcanic field. The second interval is rich in eroded Amalia Tuff and is interpreted as erosion of the edge of the Amalia outflow sheet. The third interval is entirely composed of debris of the Latir volcanic field. These intervals reflect development of the early Rio Grande rift, with the final interval showing that tilting to the east in the San Luis basin was initially slow enough that debris from the Latir field filled the basin and overflowed to the southwest.

== History of investigation ==
The Abiquiu Tuff was first named by H.T.U. Smith in 1938 for exposures near the town of Abiquiu, New Mexico. Smith designated only a type area and no type locality has been defined. Fermor S. Church and John T. Hack recognized almost at once that the unit consisted of a lower conglomeratic member and an upper tuffaceous member separated by a chert horizon (the Pedernal chert member). L.A. Woodward and R.S. Timmer first referred to the unit as the Abiquiu Formation in 1979. In 2009, Florian Maldonado and Shari A. Kelley correlated the lower conglomerate beds with the Ritito Conglomerate and removed them from the formation, retaining Pedernal Chert as an informal name for the chert beds of the transition between the Ritito Conglomerate and Abiquiu Formation.

== Cultural importance ==
Georgia O'Keeffe painted her landscape "From the White Place" in 1940 based on her study of the Abiquiu Formation at Plaza Blanca, and her studio at Abiquiu commanded a view of the Plaza Blanca outcrops to the north.
