= Servilleta Basalt =

Geologic formation in New Mexico, USA

- Stratigraphic range: Pliocene; 4.5–3.6 Ma
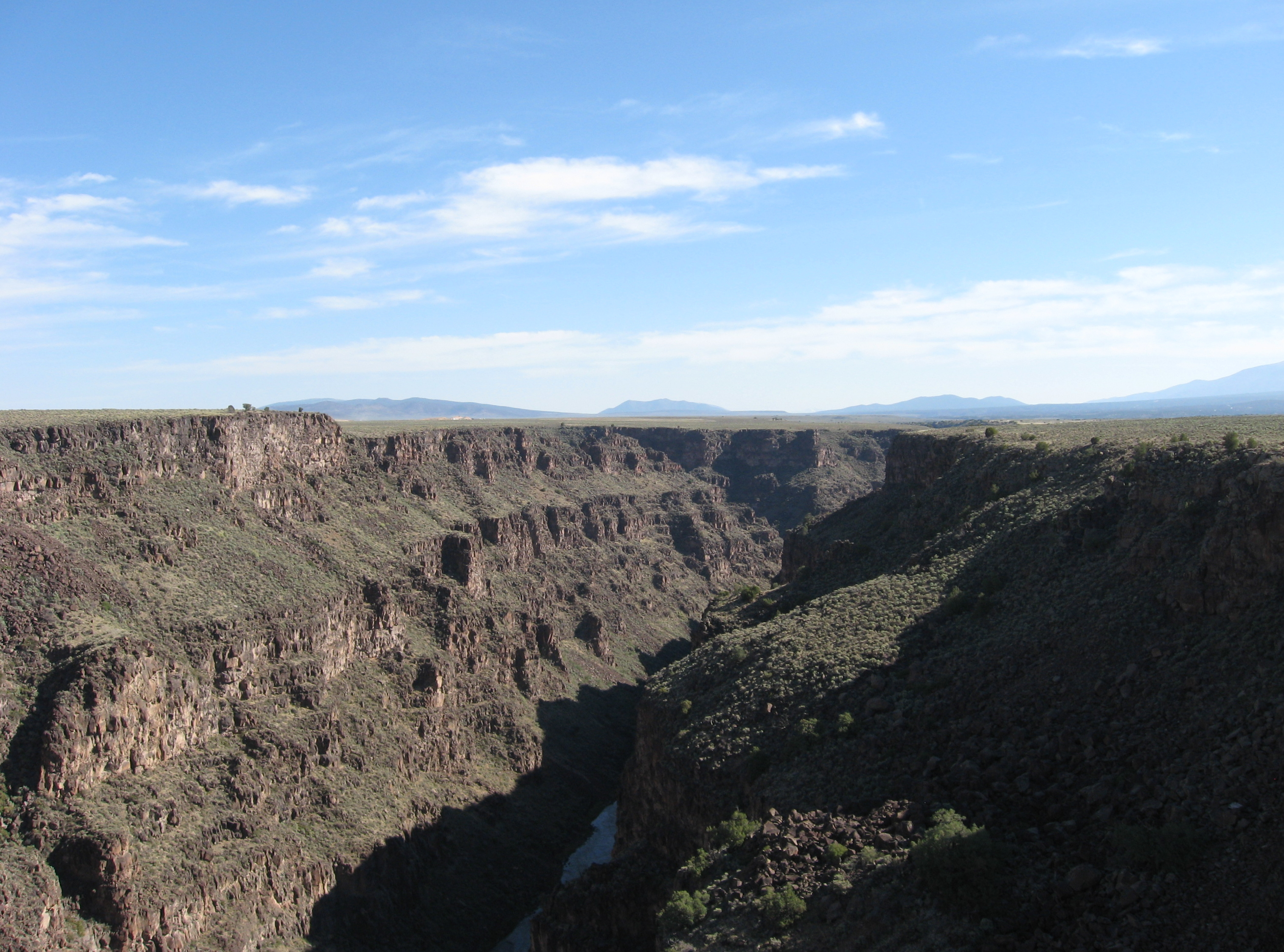
- View of Servilleta Basalt forming rim of Rio Grande Gorge.
- Type: Formation
- Overlies: Santa Fe Group, Picuris Formation
- Thickness: 1,500 ft (460 m)

Lithology
- Primary: Basalt

Location
- Coordinates: 36.553°N 105.936°W
- Region: Taos County, New Mexico
- Country: United States

Type section
- Named for: settlement of Servilleta, New Mexico
- Named by: Butler
- Year defined: 1946
- Servilleta Basalt (the United States) Servilleta Basalt (New Mexico)

The Servilleta Basalt or Servilleta Formation is a geologic formation that underlies most of the Taos Plateau of northern New Mexico. It has a radiometric age of 3.6 to 4.5 million years, corresponding to the Pliocene epoch.

== Description ==
The formation consists principally of tholeiitic olivine basalt flows with interlayered beds of alluvium. The basalt is distinctive for its olivine content (typically altered to iddingsite) and its diktytaxitic texture, in which the basalt contains microscopic laths of plagioclase that are randomly oriented and have angular spaces between grains.

Geologists have not reached consensus on whether the alluvium beds should be regarded as part of the formation. These are lithologically similar to nearby sedimentary beds of the Santa Fe Group. Those investigators who include the alluvium in the unit tend to refer to the unit as the Servilleta Formation, while those who do not tend to refer to the unit as the Servilleta Basalt.

The formation rests unconformably on the Picuris Formation, Santa Fe Group, or Hinsdale Formation. It is up to 1,500 feet (460 m) thick near Embudo but thins to 50 feet (15 m) thick adjacent to the Picuris Mountains. It is downfaulted against Santa Fe Group beds near Pilar and on the northeast side of the Picuris Mountains.

The lavas appear to have all been erupted from five shield volcanoes near the center of the Taos Plateau volcanic field. The shields are very gently sloping (less than 1.3 degrees) except for La Segita Peaks, which may be superimposed on an older basaltic andesite volcano. Another shield, Cerro Mojino, is steeper (11 degrees) but may be a structural dome rather than a vent. The shield volcanoes are free of spatter and cinder, indicating extremely fluid lava that erupted nonexplosively.

== Economic geology ==
The unit can be divided into three sets of flows separated by alluvium in the southern San Luis Valley. The alluvium separating the upper two flows is a significant local aquifer known as the Agua Azul.

== History of investigation ==
The formation was first named by A.P. Butler, Jr., in his unpublished 1946 dissertation. In 1971, Burroughs added the Mesita Member, a trachyandesite flow in the San Luis Hills, to the formation. Lipman and Menhert advocated restricting the unit to the basalt flows in 1979.
