= Petaca, New Mexico =

Petaca
- Unincorporated community
- Location within the state of New Mexico Petaca (the United States)
- Coordinates: 36°30′30″N 106°00′38″W
- Country: United States
- State: New Mexico
- County: Rio Arriba
- Elevation: 7,274 ft (2,217 m)
- Time zone: UTC-7 (Mountain (MST))
  - Summer (DST): UTC-6 (MDT)
- ZIP codes: 87554
- Area code: 505
- GNIS feature ID: 909584

Petaca is an unincorporated community located in Rio Arriba County, New Mexico, United States. The community is 15 miles (24 km) northeast of El Rito. Petaca has a post office with ZIP code 87554.
