= Sierra Nacimiento =

Mountains in New Mexico, US

Coordinates: 36°07′15″N 106°48′37″W

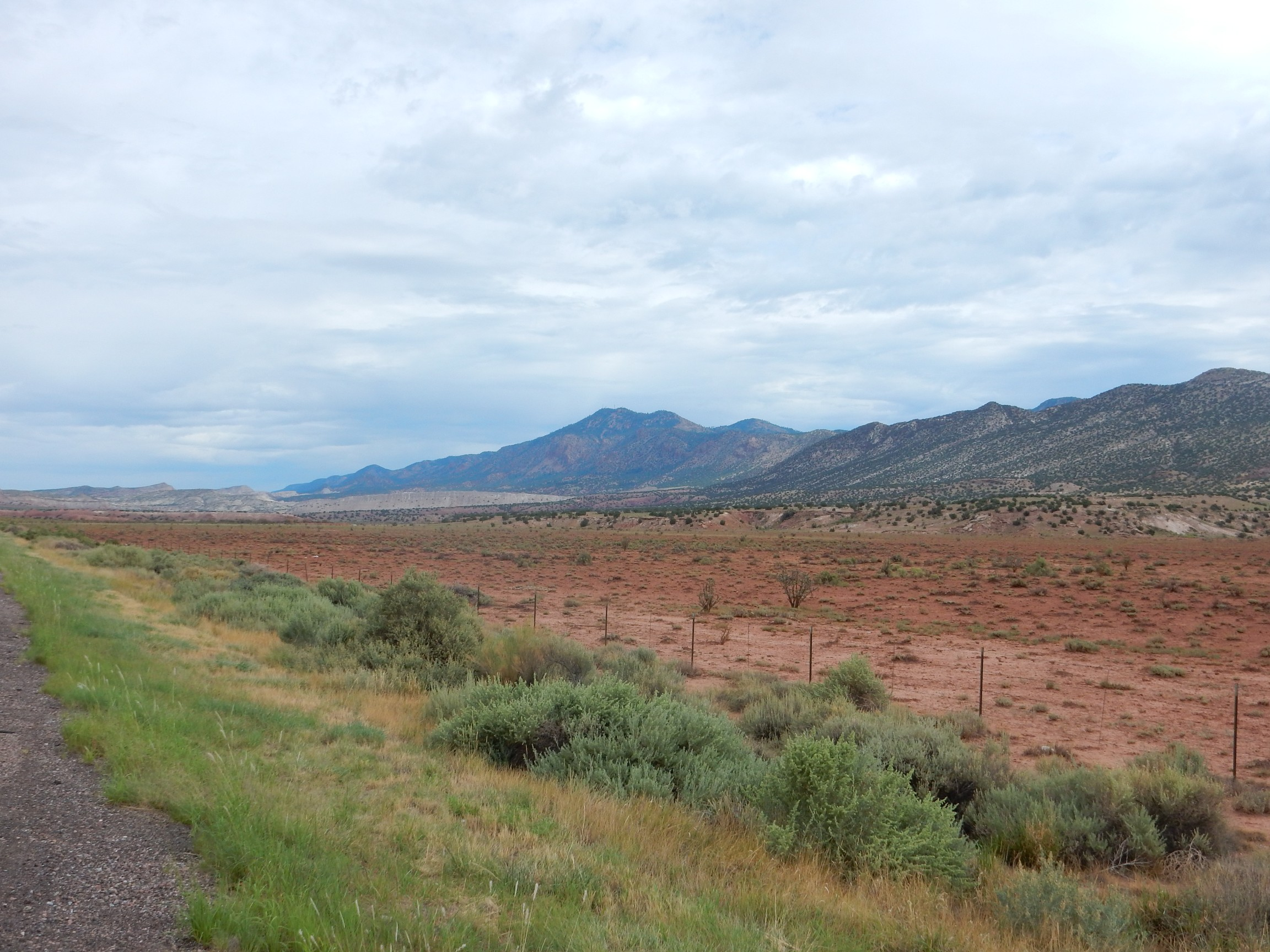
Southern Sierra Nacimiento Mountains

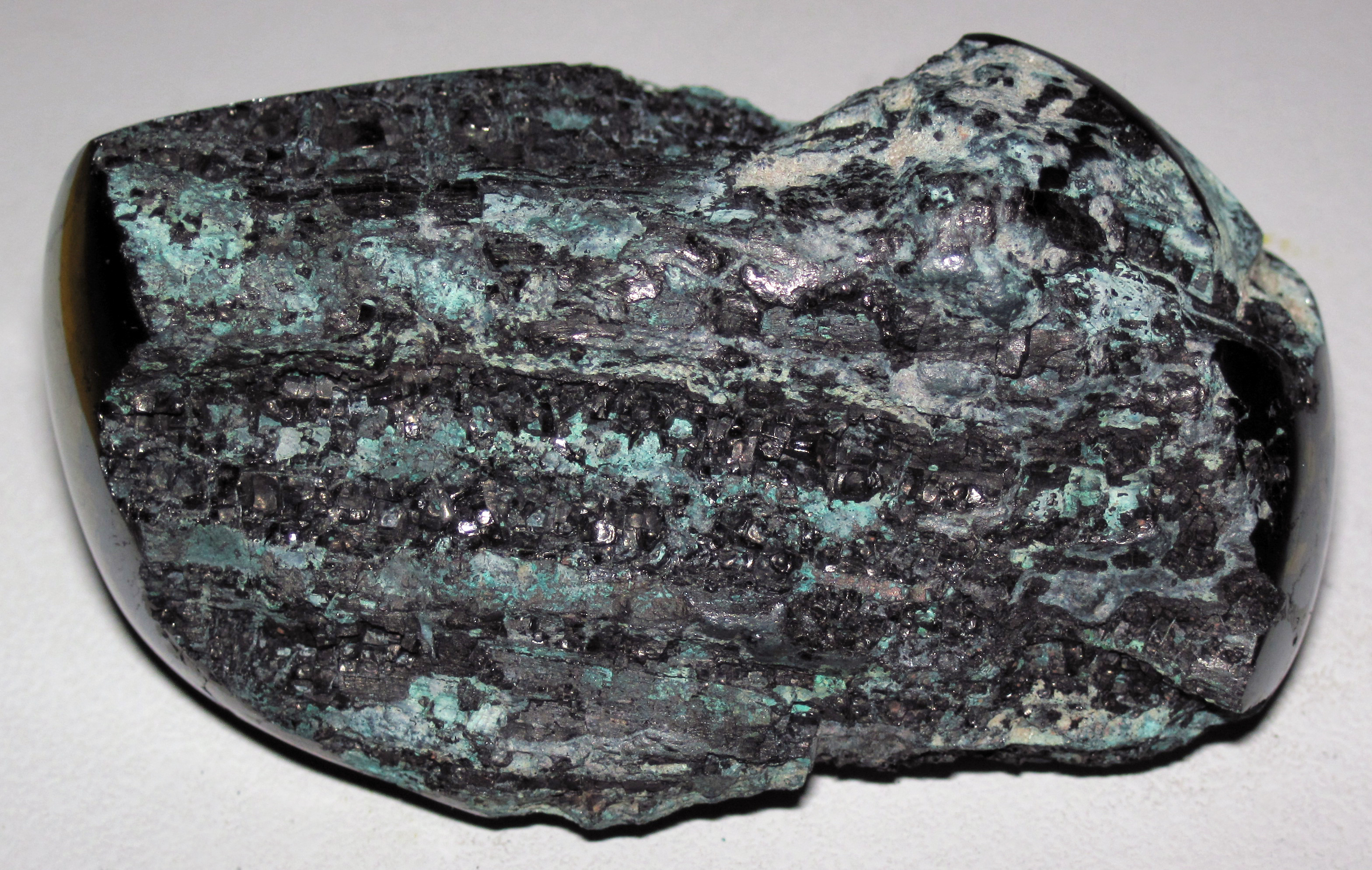
Chalcocite-rmineralized fossil wood from the Nacimiento Mine, southeast of Cuba, New Mexico.

The Sierra Nacimiento (official name), or Nacimiento Mountains, are a mountain range in the northwestern part of the U.S. state of New Mexico. They are just west of the more prominent Jemez Mountains near the town of Cuba, and are separated from them by the Río Guadalupe and the Río de Las Vacas. This article will consider them as a unit together with the San Pedro Mountains, which are a smaller range contiguous with the Sierra Nacimiento on the north, and which are also part of the Nacimiento Uplift and lie at the edge of the greater San Juan Basin, which sits atop the Colorado Plateau. The combined range runs almost due north-south with a length of about 40 mi (65 km). The highest point in the combined range is the high point of the San Pedro Peaks, known unofficially as San Pedro Peak, 10,605 ft (3,232 m).

The Nacimientos are of some geological interest despite their modest elevation, as they form the western boundary of the Rio Grande Rift, a major rift valley containing the Rio Grande. The corresponding range on the east side of the rift, the Sangre de Cristo Mountains, is significantly higher and more rugged than the Nacimientos, which consist of long, gentle ridges never reaching above tree line. The Jemez Mountains lie between the Nacimientos and the Sangre de Cristos and are sometimes mistakenly thought to be part of the structure of the rift, but in fact are of volcanic origin rather than part of the graben of which the Nacimientos and Sangre de Cristos are the obvious manifestations.

The San Pedro Mountains are a high plateau that geologists interpret as an old erosional surface. This is overlain by remnants of the Pedernal Chert and Ritito Conglomerate, which are relatively young geological formations. These reveal the geologic history of this part of the Nacimiento Uplift, showing that it was uplifted during the Laramide orogeny (mountain-building episode), then eroded nearly flat and partially buried under younger sediments, then uplifted again as part of the western margin of the Rio Grande Rift.

Much of the range is within the San Pedro Parks Wilderness area and is protected against development. Hiking trails crisscross the wilderness area, making it a popular destination for backpackers. The range receives more orographic precipitation than many other New Mexico mountains, as there are no higher ranges upwind for a considerable distance. Accordingly, the trails in the wilderness area are frequently soft and soggy for much of the year. San Gregorio Lake, an artificial lake at the south end of the wilderness, is a popular location for fishing.

The name "Nacimiento" means literally "birth" or "the Nativity" but also "source of a river." The latter meaning applies here since the Rio Puerco has its source on the west side of the mountains.
