= Geology of New Mexico =

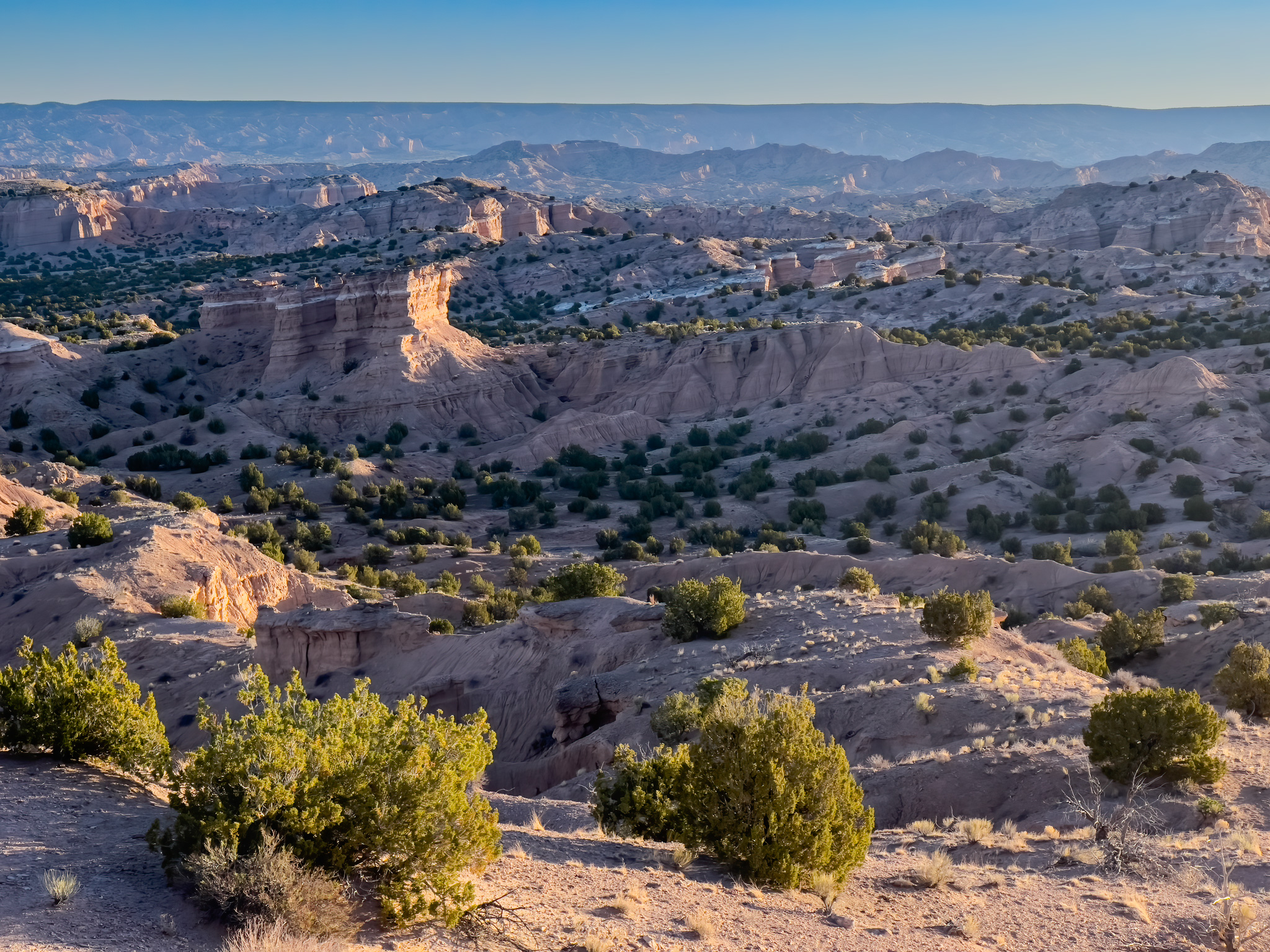
A view of the Nambe Badlands

The geology of New Mexico includes bedrock exposures of four physiographic provinces, with ages ranging from almost 1800 million years (Ma) to nearly the present day. Here the Great Plains, southern Rocky Mountains, Colorado Plateau, and Basin and Range Provinces meet, giving the state great geologic diversity.

The geologic history of the state began with its assembly during the Yavapai and Mazatzal orogenies 1750 to 1650 million years ago (Mya). This was followed by 200 million years of tectonic quiescence that ended in the Picuris orogeny. This event transformed the New Mexico crust into mature continental crust. Over a thousand million years of tectonic quiescence followed, ending with the rise of the Ancestral Rocky Mountains in Pennsylvanian time, 300 Mya. The Permian and most of the Mesozoic were another interval of relative tectonic quiescence, where gradual subsidence deposited formations that preserve an impressive stratigraphic record across the state. This ended with the Laramide orogeny, beginning around 70 Mya, which elevated most of the mountain ranges of modern New Mexico and was accompanied by violent volcanic activity. The opening of the Rio Grande rift commenced around 30 Mya, and was followed by late Cenozoic volcanism along the Jemez Lineament, particularly in the Jemez volcanic field.

Most of New Mexico has a semiarid to arid climate, and ground water in aquifers is an important geologic resource for farmers and municipal areas. In 2019, oil and gas production yielded $3.1 billion in oil and gas taxes and revenues for the state. Mining has historically also been important.

Geologic hazards are infrequent in New Mexico, but potential dangers include erosion or flash flooding in arroyos; arsenic or other contamination of ground water or soil; sinkholes or other subsidence; earthquakes; mass wasting (such as landslides); mine hazards; oil field hazards; radon accumulation in homes; or volcanic eruptions.

== Physiography ==
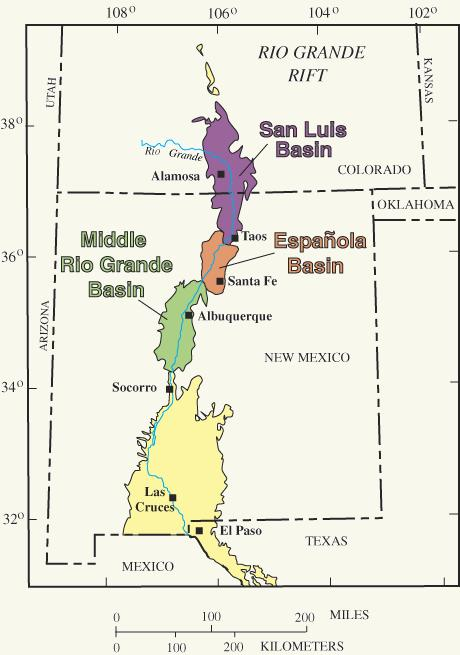
Basins of the Rio Grande Rift

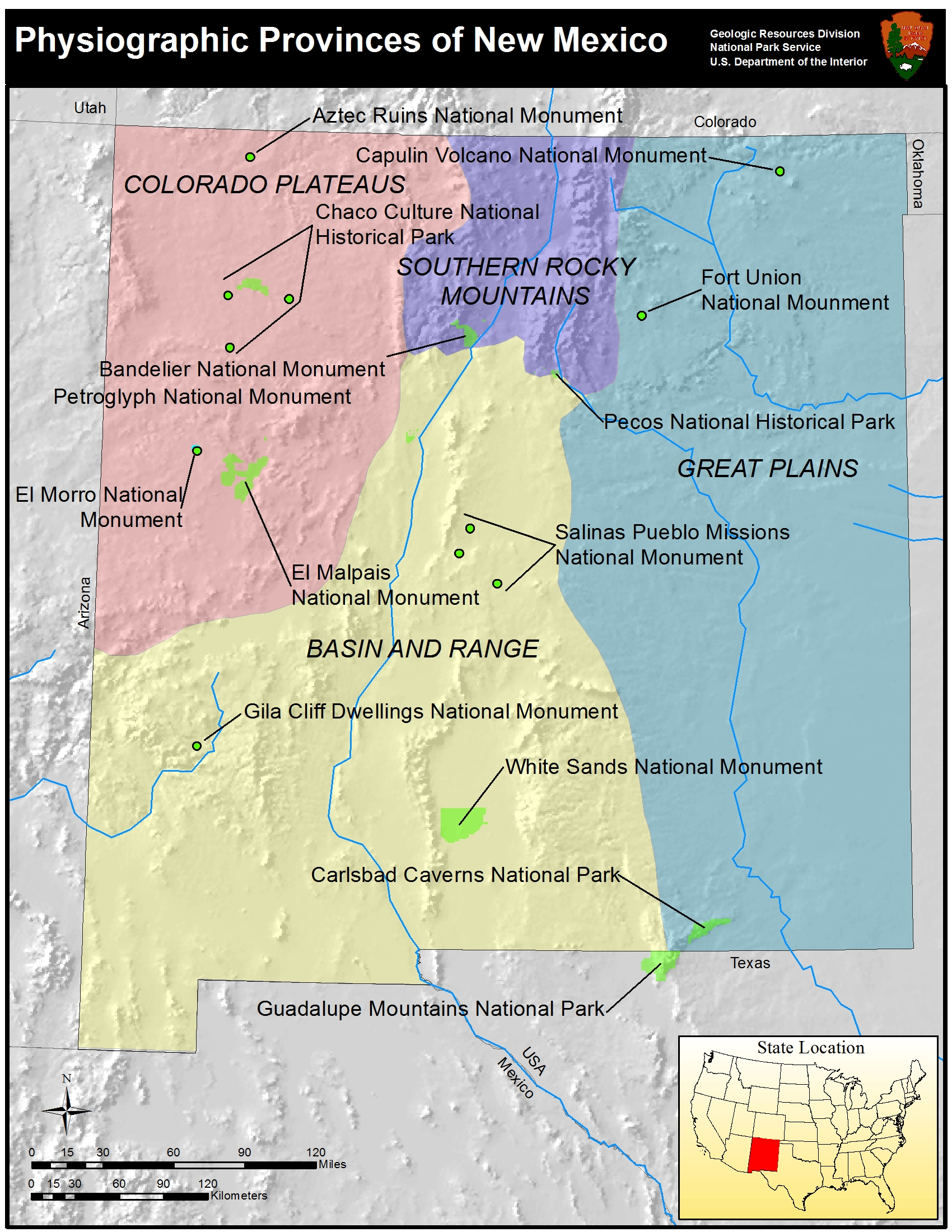
Map of physiographic provinces of New Mexico

New Mexico is entirely landbound, with just 0.2% of the state covered with water, and most of the state has an arid to semiarid climate. Much of the state is mountainous, except for the easternmost Great Plains region. The state thus has extensive bedrock exposures, which are assigned to four physiographic provinces. These are the Great Plains, which makes up the eastern third of the state; the southern Rocky Mountains in the north-central part of the state; the Colorado Plateau in the northwestern part of the state; and Basin and Range Provinces in the southwestern part of the state. The presence of these four physiographic provinces gives the state great geological diversity.

Rocks exposed in the southern Rocky Mountains are as old as nearly 1800 million years (Ma), while some volcanic flows in the state are geologically very young.

An important geologic feature of New Mexico is the Rio Grande Rift. This extends from central Colorado to northern Chihuahua, Mexico, passing from north to south through the center of the state, cutting across the southern Rocky Mountains and the Basin and Range provinces, and roughly coinciding with the valley of the Rio Grande River. The rift marks where the Colorado Plateau in the west has pulled away from the interior of the North American craton on the east. It has been the focus of significant scientific research on continental rift processes.

== Stratigraphy, tectonics, and geologic history ==
=== Proterozoic ===
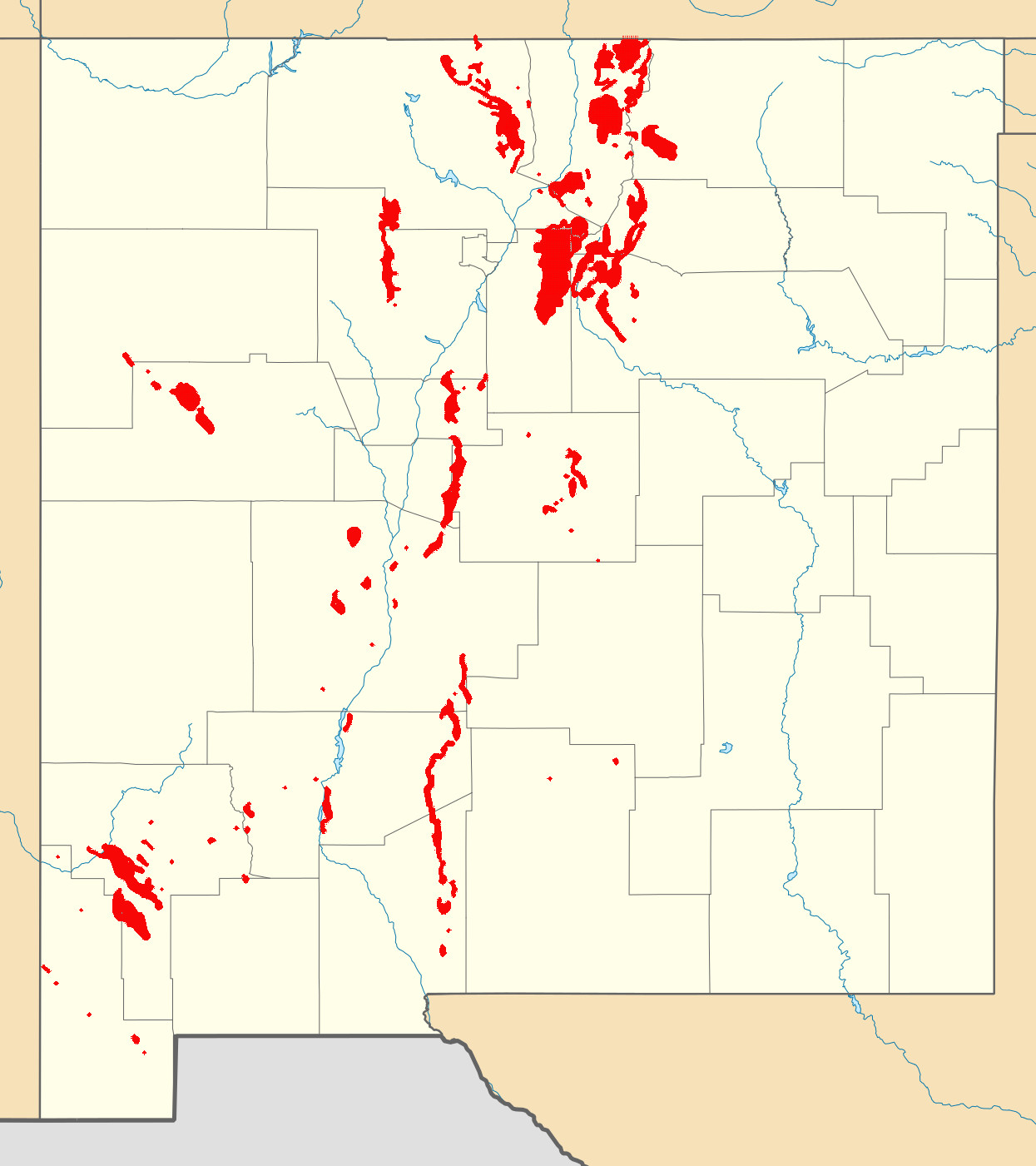
Map of Precambrian bedrock exposures in New Mexico

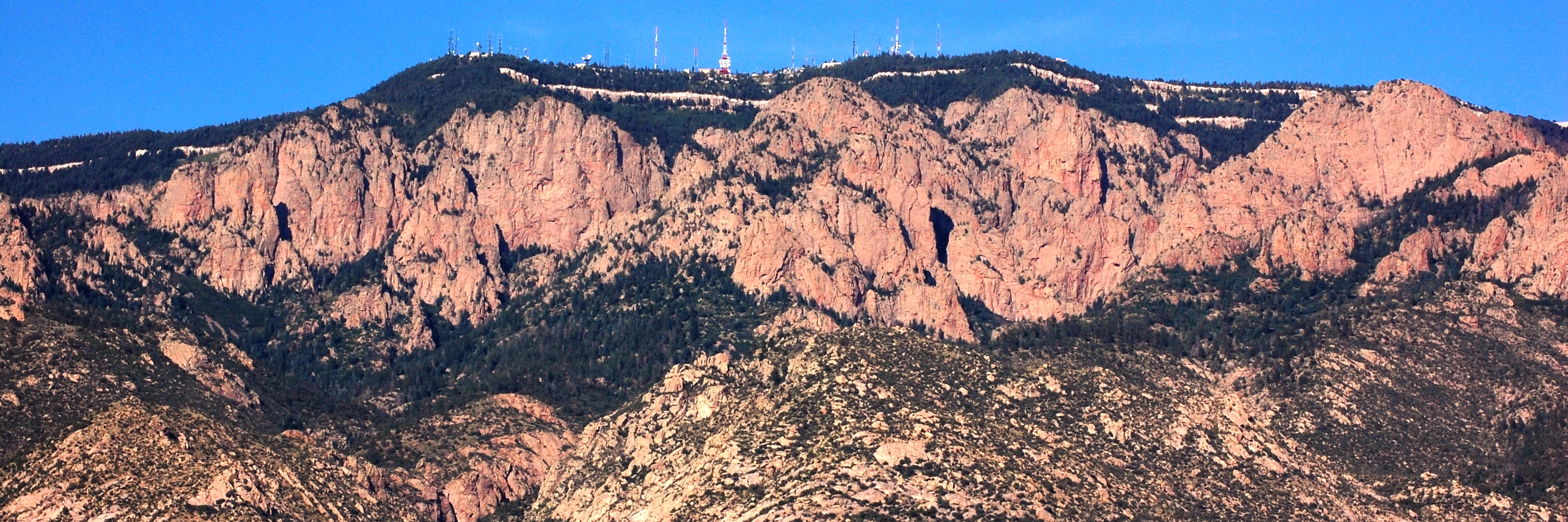
Sandia Crest, an uplifted Mesoproterozoic batholith

The crust underlying the state formed between 1.7 and 1.8 billion years ago as island arcs. This is recorded in the rocks of the Moppin Complex, the Gold Hill complex, and the Pecos greenstone belt in northern New Mexico. These are described as juvenile crust, because their Nd model ages are close to the crystallization ages determined from U-Pb dating. This indicates that the material making up the island arcs was extracted from the Earth's mantle only shortly before the island arcs formed. These rocks are mostly amphibolites thought to be formed by metamorphism of tholeiitic basalt.

The island arcs were carried into a subduction zone along the margin of Laurentia, the ancient core of North America, around 1700 million years ago, an event called the Yavapai orogeny. The arcs accreted to the continental margin, forming a band of new continental crust stretching from Arizona to Newfoundland and from the Wyoming-Colorado border to central New Mexico. These events are recorded in the rocks of the Vadito Group and Hondo Group. A second set of slightly younger island arcs accreted to the continented shortly after, around 1650 to 1600 Mya, during the Mazatzal orogeny. The Mazatzal beds now underlie most of southern New Mexico and the Mazatzal orogeny is recorded in the Manzano Group of the Manzano and Los Pinos mountains.

Precambrian rocks crop out across approximately five percent of New Mexico and underlie the entire state. The rocks now exposed at the surface were uplifted during the Paleozoic, the early Cenozoic Laramide orogeny as well as block faulting and tilting in the more recent geologic past. For the most part, these rocks are exposed along the Rio Grande rift in the center of New Mexico, except in the Zuni Mountains and Big Burro Mountains. The total relief of Precambrian rocks is 11 kilometers.

The rocks are 70 percent plutons and 30 percent supracrustal formed between 1.765 and 1.4 billion years ago in the Proterozoic, based on uranium-lead dating. All of the rocks more than 1.65 billion years old show evidence of metamorphism ranging between greenschist and amphibolite grade on the sequence of metamorphic facies. An area in the Cimarron Range in the vicinity of Taos reached granulite facies. Geologists debate the extent of different terranes—sections of continental crust—that joined. Metavolcanic rocks in the Tusas Mountains may be among the oldest, which are intruded by 1.65 billion year old trondhjemite, but display more than one metamorphic fabric. Metasomatic 1.68 billion year old stratabound tourmalinites in the Tusas Mountains suggest a localized crustal boron sequestration event occurred during the Yavapai orogeny.

Precambrian rocks formed volcanogenic polymetallic sulfides, rich in gold, silver and tungsten, kyanite, copper veins and pegmatite with beryllium, lithium, niobium, tantalum and mica.

The region was tectonically quiescent until around 1400 Mya, when the poorly understood Picuris orogeny deformed and metamorphosed much of the crust of New Mexico. This event is recorded in the rock of the Trampas Group and in extensive batholiths intruded into the crust throughout the western United States, such as the Sandia Crest batholith. Following the Picuris orogeny, northern New Mexico was again tectonically quiet, while southern New Mexico experience some deformation associated with the Grenville orogeny. This is recorded in the Allamoore and Tumbledown Formations (about 1250 Mya) and the De Baca Group and Los Animas Formation (about 1200 Mya). Thereafter the region experienced steady erosion, which in some cases brought rock near the surface that had been buried as deep as 10 kilometers (6.2 miles). This beveled much of New Mexico almost completely flat, forming a peneplain.

=== Paleozoic (541-251 million years ago) ===
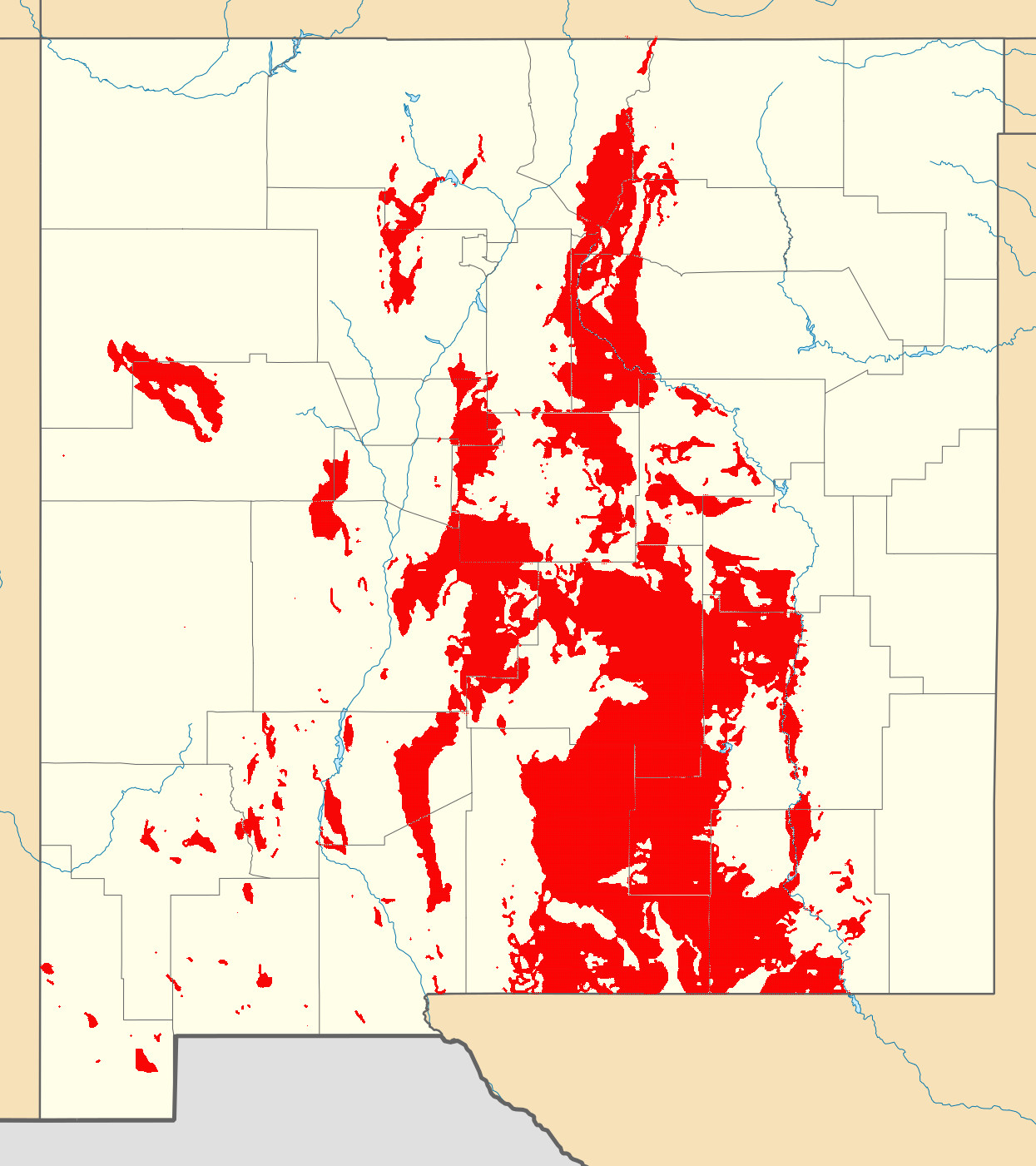
Map of Paleozoic exposures in New Mexico

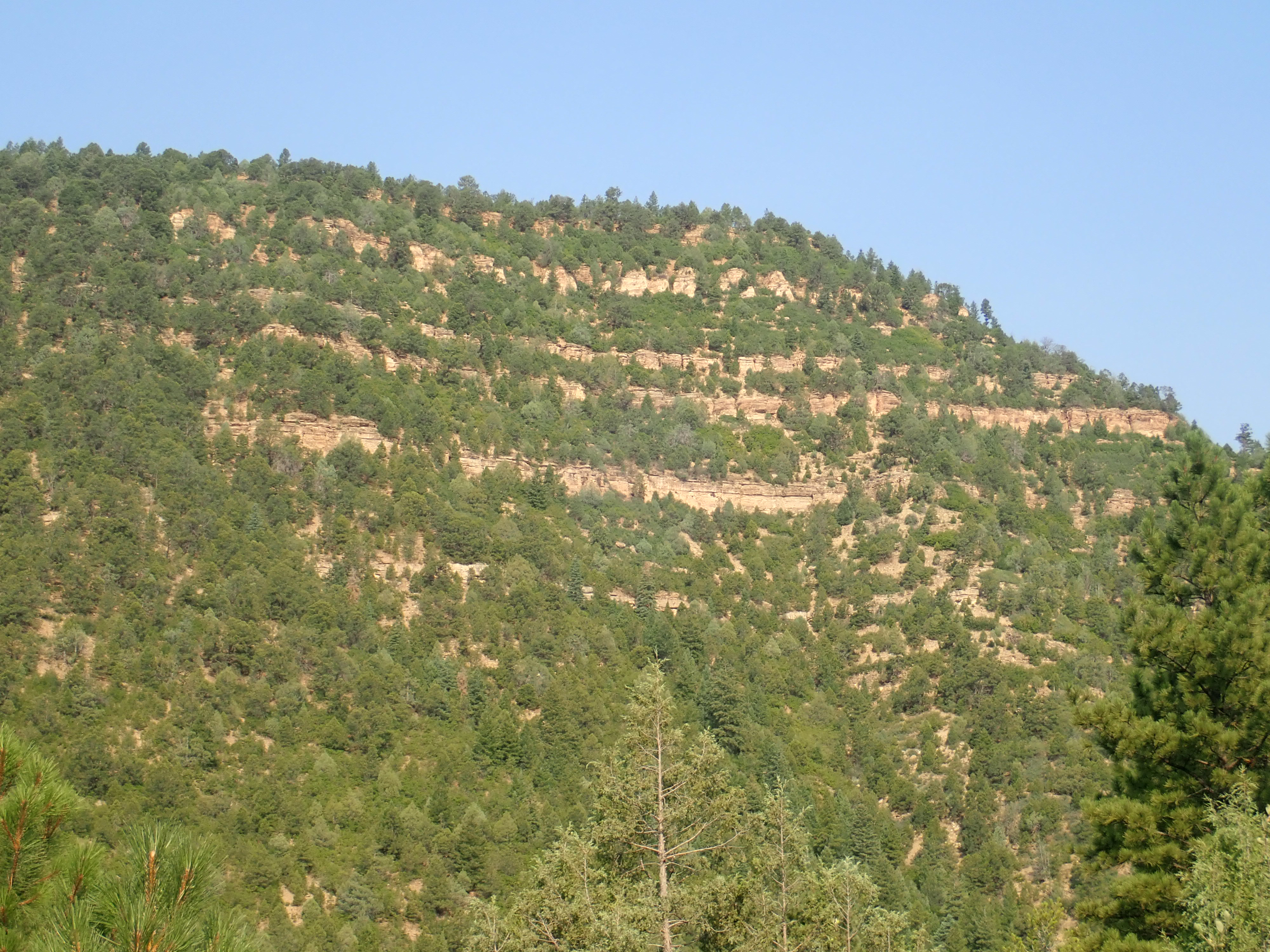
Pennsylvanian limestone of the La Pasada Formation in the Sangre de Cristo Mountains

New Mexico at the start of the Paleozoic was dominated by the Transcontinental Arch, an elevated region from Minnesota to northern New Mexico. Small quantities of alkaline magma were intruded in the early Cambrian along north–south faults, which may indicate incipient rifting of the New Mexico aulacogen. Later in the Cambrian, the sea began to advance northeast across New Mexico, beginning in the boot heel of the state (Sauk sequence) and sedimentary beds were deposited during the Cambrian through Devonian, beginning with the Cambrian Bliss Formation. The sea did not submerge the Transcontinental Arch until Mississippian time.

By the late Paleozoic, in the Pennsylvanian and Permian, the rise of the Ancestral Rocky Mountains broke the ancient peneplain into basins separated by uplifts. Fossiliferous marine limestone such as the Madera Group was deposited in the basin shelves, while areas receiving debris eroded off the highlands formed clastic sedimentary formations such as Flechado Formation or Sangre de Cristo Formation. Towards the end of the Pennsylvanian, fluctuations in sea level caused by global glaciation produced cyclic formations like the Bursum Formation, marking the transition from marine to continental sedimentation. The latter is recorded by red bed formations such as the Abo Formation or the Cutler Group. The Cutler Group contain important fossil quarries that shed light on the early evolution of tetrapods. Continental sedimentation began in the north and prograded to the south.

At the same time, a deep basin, the Delaware Basin, formed in southeastern New Mexico and Texas, surrounded by the massive Capitan barrier reef. A brief rise in sea level deposited the limestone of the San Andres Formation across much of New Mexico, making this the most extensive Paleozoic formation exposed in the state. The subsequent retreat of the sea resulted in deposition of large deposits of gypsum, potash and salt of the Castile and Salado Formations in the Delaware Basin.

=== Mesozoic (251-66 million years ago) ===
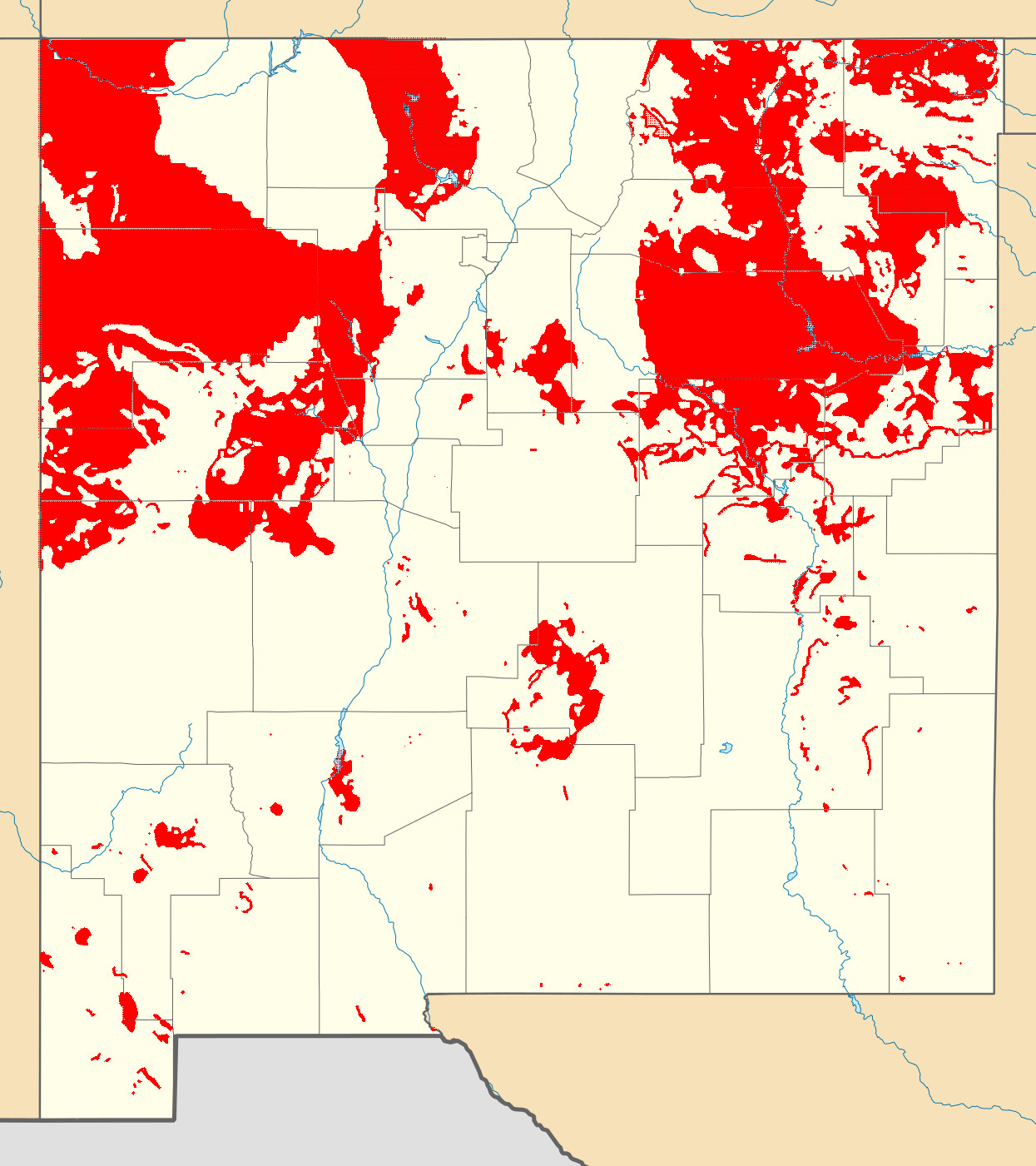
Map of Mesozoic exposures in New Mexico, USA

The Mesozoic began with the Permian-Triassic extinction event. The Sevier and Nevadan orogenies pushed up mountains to the west of New Mexico that produced a rain shadow, giving New Mexico an exquisitely hot and dry climate through much of the early Mesozoic.

The lower Triassic is recorded nowhere in the rock beds of New Mexico, but the middle Triassic is recorded in beds of the Moenkopi and Anton Chico Formations. The Moenkopi represents deposition in a coastal plain by rivers running to the west. This pattern continued into the late Triassic, when the climate become somewhat cooler and wetter, and a substantial river system developed through New Mexico that deposited the Chinle Group. The Rock Point Formation of the Chinle Group preserved large numbers of fossils of Coelophysis, one of the earliest known genera of dinosaurs.

The Jurassic was again a time of arid climate. A great dune sea, or erg, spread across northern New Mexico and deposited the sandstone of the Entrada Formation. This was followed by flooding of northern New Mexico by an arm of the Sundance Sea, leading to deposition of the limestone and gypsum beds of the Todilto Formation. The Jurassic ended with the deposition of the Summerville and Morrison Formations, the latter deposited in a vast foreland basin east of the coastal mountains thrown up by the Sevier orogeny.

The increasing weight of the Sonoma mountains to the west drove subsidence of its foreland basin, which included most of New Mexico. During the Cretaceous, the region was submerged by the Western Interior Seaway, which deposited shore formations such as the Dakota Formation and marine formations such as the Mancos Formation. Advances and retreats of the coastline are recorded in formations such as the Mesaverde Group.

Towards the end of the Cretaceous, shallow subduction of the Farallon plate drove the Laramide orogeny, which uplifted the Rocky Mountains and lasted into the Cenozoic.

=== Cenozoic (66 million years ago-present) ===
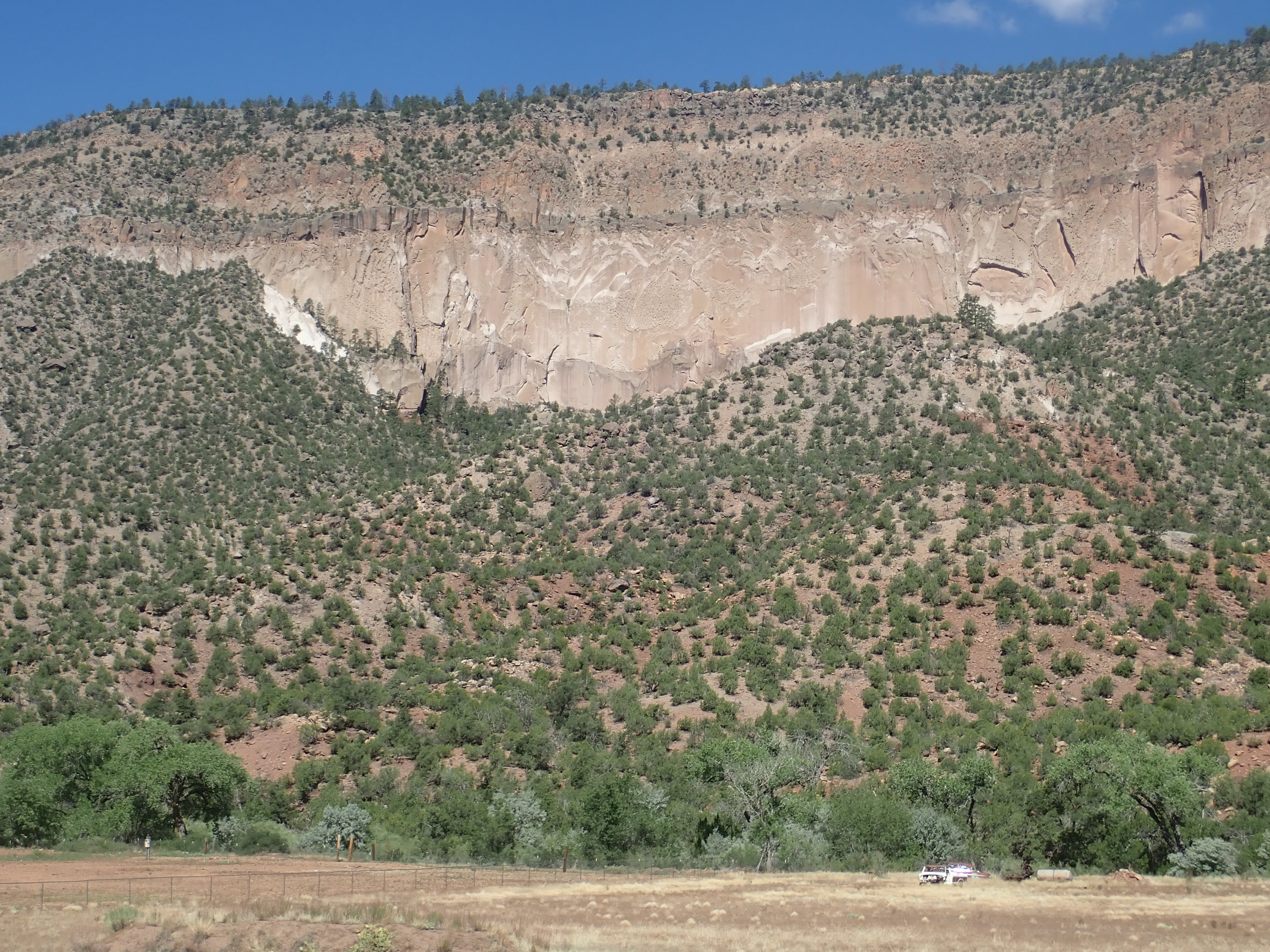
Bandelier Tuff in San Diego Canyon

The Laramide Orogeny changed the topography of New Mexico into one of high uplifts and deep basins. The basins began to fill with sediments during the Eocene, recorded in formations such as the San Jose Formation, the Galisteo Formation, and the Baca Formation.

As the Farallon plate disintegrated and sank into the mantle, hot asthenosphere rock rose to take its place. This helped trigger the Mid-Tertiary ignimbrite flare-up, which deposited significant ash falls across much of New Mexico. The vast Mogollon-Datil volcanic field was active during this time, as were the smaller Latir volcanic field and the Ortiz porphyry belt

The rise of hot asthenosphere below New Mexico reversed the compression of the crust and put it into tension, resulting in the opening of the Rio Grande rift, beginning about 30 Mya, and the development of Basin and Range geology across the southern part of the state. The development of the Rio Grande rift is recorded in the rocks of the Santa Fe Group.

The Jemez volcanic field began to develop around 15 Mya, and volcanic activity subsequently spread southwest and northeast along the Jemez Lineament. The Valles Caldera (or Jemez Caldera) formed in the Jemez Mountains 1.25 Mya ago in the Pleistocene, exploding and then collapsing into its magma chamber and emplacing the Bandelier Tuff. Small mountain glaciers formed in the Brazos and Sangre de Cristo Mountains.

== Natural resource geology ==
Under Spanish rule turquoise and lead were mined near Cerillos and copper was found at Santa Rita in the southwest in 1798. Artisanal mining for placer gold took place after an 1821 discovery in the Ortiz Mountains south of Santa Fe. New deposits, along with the reopened Spanish mine in Silver City prompted a boom in copper mining in the late 19th century. Placer gold mining expanded into the Sangre de Cristo Mountains and along the Rio Grande, while lead mining got underway in Las Cruces. Coal was discovered near gold and copper mines and potentially recoverable gold deposits grew more numerous as prospectors traced placer gold back to the veins where it originated.

In 1863, silver was found in Magdalena, west of Socorro, followed by a large find in Grant County. Silver City, White Oaks, Ute Creek, Cerrillos, Elizabethtown, Twining, Chloride, Hondo Canyon, Red River Canyon and Socorro were soon discovered to also have silver. Rising costs and depleted ore bodies have led to widespread abandonment and ghost towns throughout the state, which remain comparatively well-preserved in the dry climate.

Mining is still a cornerstone of the New Mexico economy, although it has largely shifted to open-pit extraction. Coal is mined in the northwest and copper, silver, gold, manganese, zinc and lead are extracted near Silver City. Molybdenum is an important resource in the Sangre de Cristo mountains, including the Questa Mine. Uranium is still mined close to Grants, although production has dropped after a high point between the 1950s and the 1970s. Gypsum, limestone, potash and salt are mined out of Pennsylvanian and Permian rocks in the east. Mining accounted for 3,763 jobs by 2018.

The San Juan Basin in the northwest has active oil and gas production, along with the small extent of the Permian Basin in the southeast. Oil and gas production in the state totalled 1,820,963,878 MCF of natural gas and 331,460,749 barrels of oil in 2019, yielding $3.1 billion in oil and gas taxes and revenues for the state. Mining has historically been important, but accounted for just 3,763 jobs by 2018.

Because of New Mexico's typically semiarid climate, ground water in aquifers is an important geologic resource for farmers and municipal areas. The groundwater potential of the Santa Fe Group was recognized by Kirk Bryan in 1938, and the Alamosa subbasin of the San Luis Valley, the central part of the Albuquerque Basin, and the southern Mesilla basin from Las Cruces to El Paso are now among the most productive groundwater reservoirs in the western United States.

== Geologic hazards ==
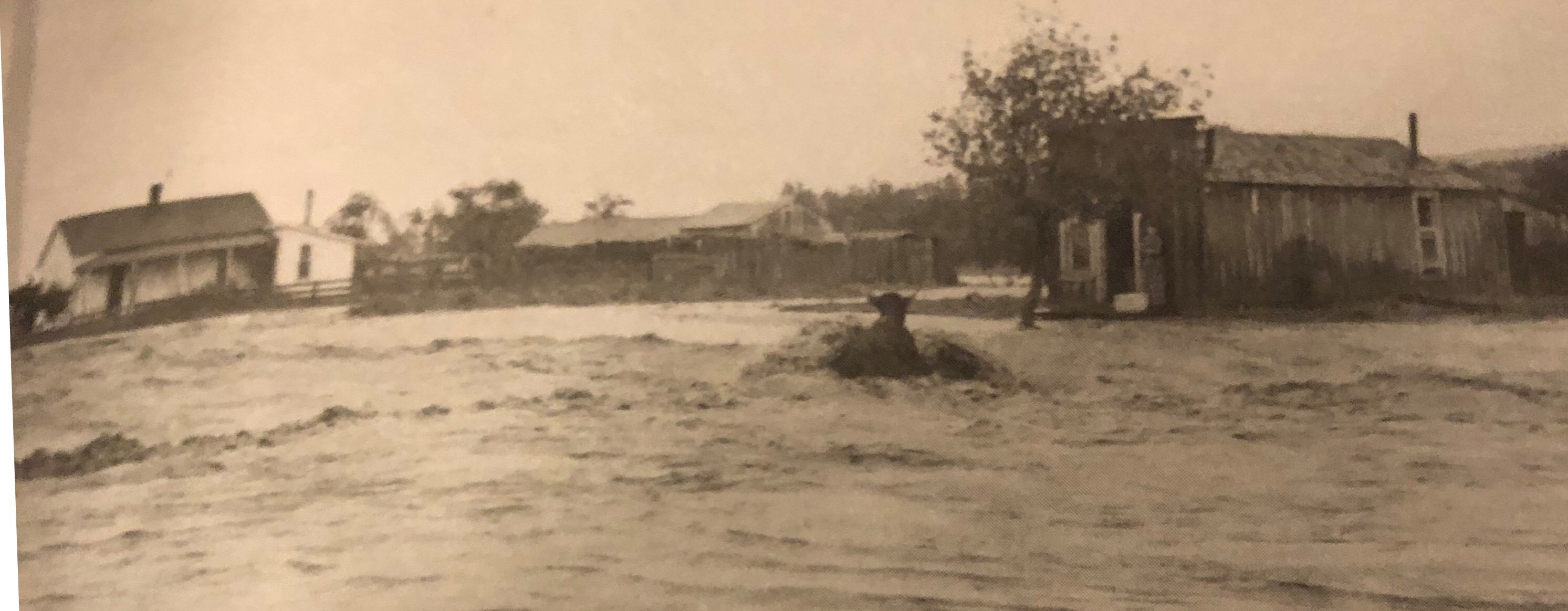
A flash flood devastated the area around Folsom, New Mexico in August 1908

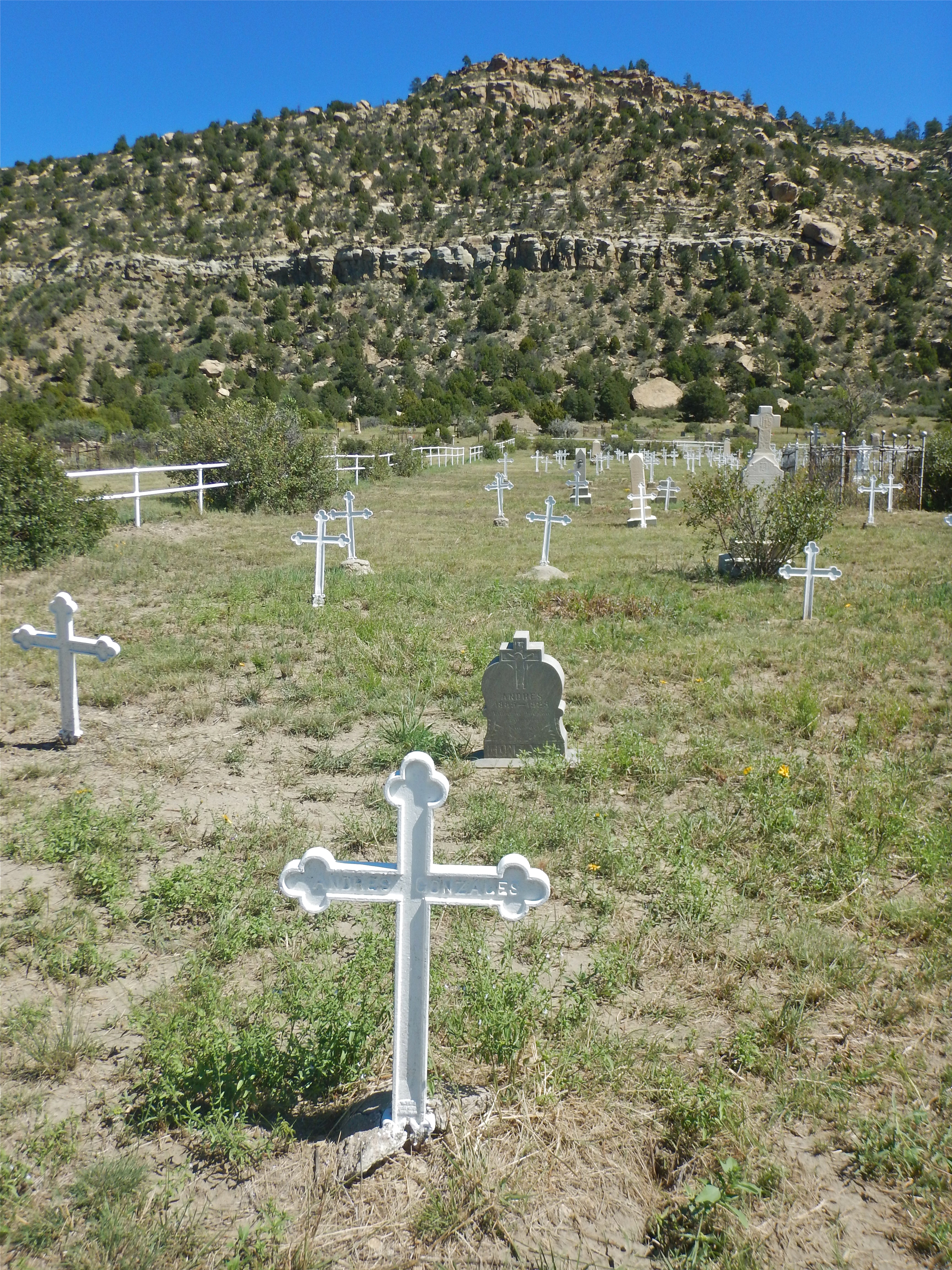
cemetery for victims of mining disasters in the old coal mining town of Dawson, New Mexico

Geologic hazards are infrequent in New Mexico, but potential dangers include erosion or flash flooding in arroyos; arsenic or other contamination of ground water or soil; sinkholes or other subsidence; earthquakes; mass wasting (such as landslides); mine hazards; oil field hazards; radon accumulation in homes; or volcanic eruptions.

Flooding is one of the more common geologic hazards in New Mexico. Historically significant flooding events included extensive river flooding accompanied by local flash floods in September 1941; river flooding across the northeastern High Plains region between June 14–17, 1965; severe flooding resulting from rainfall onto heavy snow accumulations in southwestern and south central New Mexico on December 18–19, 1978; flooding after heavy rainfall from the remnants of Hurricane Doly between July 26–28, 2008; and widespread flooding from an unusually wet monsoon season in the summer of 2006. The state is occasionally impacted by remnants of East Pacific tropical storms that carry considerable moisture, and such storm remnants contributed to both the 1941 and the 2008 floods.

Earthquake hazards are moderate in New Mexico compared with California or the Wasatch Front in Utah. One estimate puts the probability of a large earthquake in the southern Rio Grande Rift in the next century at 5%. However, faults are concentrated along the Rio Grande Rift, with its urban centers, and while only 20 faults in the state are considered active, the consequences of an earthquake could be serious. The large number of faults increases the likelihood of an earthquake even though rupture of any one fault is infrequent. The largest earthquakes in historic times were two magnitude 5.8 earthquakes in 1906 near Socorro, likely associated with the Socorro magma body, a shallow horizontal magma intrusion in the crust.
