= Trampas Group =

Group of geologic formations in New Mexico, US

- Stratigraphic range: Calymmian
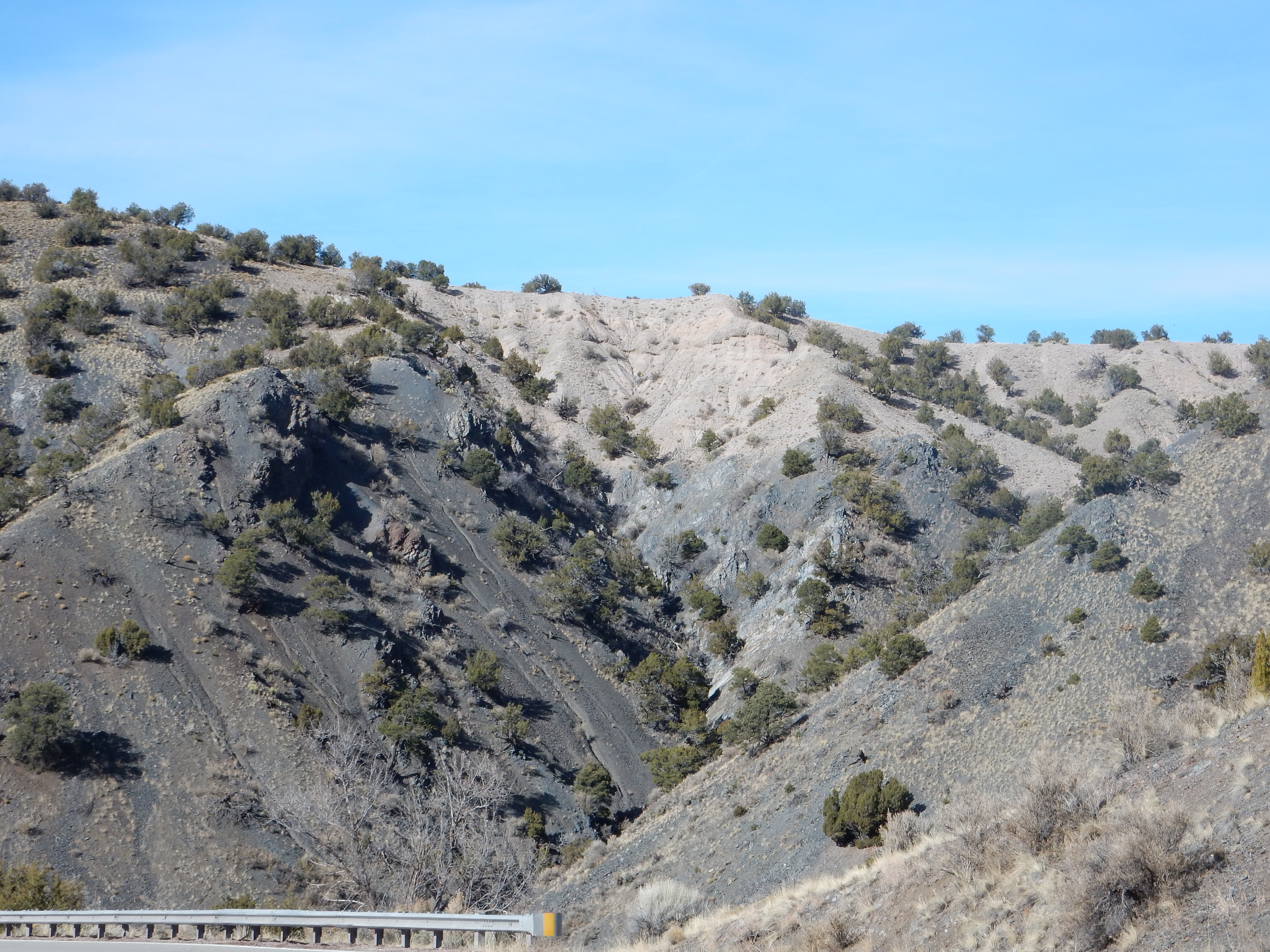
- Trampas Group beds in Picuris Mountains
- Type: Group
- Sub-units: Piedra Lumbre Formation; Pilar Formation
- Underlies: Marquenas Formation
- Overlies: Ortega Formation
- Thickness: 1,000 m (3,300 ft)

Lithology
- Primary: Schist, phyllite
- Other: Quartzite

Location
- Coordinates: 36.202°N 105.872°W
- Region: Picuris Mountains, New Mexico
- Country: United States

Type section
- Named for: Trampas, New Mexico
- Named by: Daniel, Pfeiffer, Jones, and McFarlane
- Year defined: 2013
- Trampas Group (the United States) Trampas Group (New Mexico)

The Trampas Group is a group of geologic formations that crops out in the Picuris Mountains of northern New Mexico. Detrital zircon geochronology yields a maximum age of 1475 million years, corresponding to the Calymmian period.

== Description ==
The Trampas Group consists of metasedimentary formations deposited in the reactivated Pilar Basin during the Picuris orogeny. Detrital zircon geochronology yields a maximum age of 1475 Mya, considerably younger than the underlying Hondo Group.

The formations included in the Trampas Group are the Pilar Formation, a carbonaceous phyllite, and the Piedra Lumbre Formation, which is primarily feldspathic schist with some quartzite and phyllite.

The Trampas Group likely was deposited in a basin formed during the breakup of the supercontinent of Columbia.

== History of investigation ==
The formations of the Trampas Group were originally included by Bauer and Williams in the Hondo Group as part of their sweeping revision of northern New Mexico Precambrian stratigraphy in 1989. However, detrital zircon geochronology demonstrated that while the lower two formations of the original Hondo Group, the Ortega Formation and the Rinconada Formation, were Statherian in age, the upper two formations, the Pilar Formation and the Piedra Lumbre Formation, were Calymmian in age and they were removed into their own Trampas Group.
