= Piedra Lumbre Formation =

Geologic formation in New Mexico, US

- Stratigraphic range: Calymmian
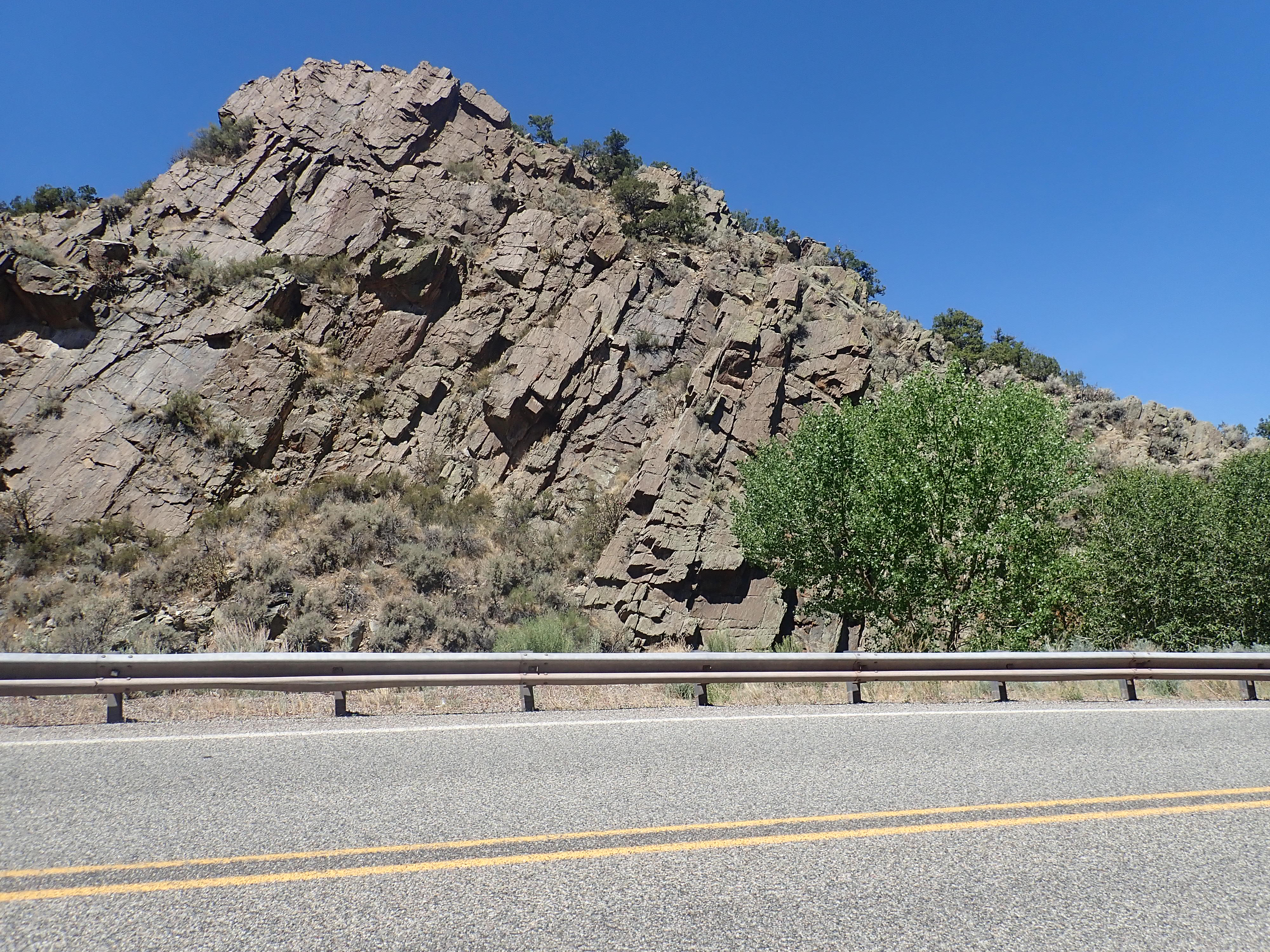
- Outcrop of Piedra Lumbre Formation along highway from Dixon to Picuris Pueblo, New Mexico, USA
- Type: Formation
- Unit of: Trampas Group
- Underlies: Marquenas Formation
- Overlies: Pilar Formation
- Thickness: 300 m (980 ft)

Lithology
- Primary: Schist
- Other: Quartzite

Location
- Coordinates: 36.2088292°N 105.8257916°W
- Region: Picuris Mountains, New Mexico
- Country: United States

Type section
- Named for: Canada de Piedra Lumbre
- Named by: Long
- Year defined: 1976
- Piedra Lumbre Formation (the United States) Piedra Lumbre Formation (New Mexico)

The Piedra Lumbre Formation is a geologic formation that crops out in the Picuris Mountains of northern New Mexico. Detrital zircon geochronology yields a maximum age of 1475 million years, corresponding to the Calymmian period.

== Description ==
The Piedra Lumbre Formation consists of light gray to black phyllite or schist. The formation has been subject to extreme deformation within the Hondo syncline that confuses the stratigraphic picture.

The formation can be divided into three members, beginning with a lower member, about 40 meters (130 feet) thick, of quartz-muscovite-biotite-garnet-staurolite phyllitic schist. This is characterized by light gray crenulated cleavage surfaces sprinkled with small garnet, biotite, and staurolite crystals. The middle member is interbedded light gray schist and quartzite, with the top 10 meters (33 feet) primarily black phyllitic schist with white banding. The quartzite beds towards the base of this member contain thin calcareous beds. The upper member is 5–10 meters (16–33 feet) of phyllitic slate that resembles the Pilar Formation but is distinguished by its stratigraphic position.

Detrital zircon geochronology yields a maximum age of 1475 Mya, similar to the underlying Pilar Formation but considerably younger than the lower Hondo Group. This suggests that the Pilar Formation and Piedra Lumbre Formation should be removed from the Hondo Group and provides evidence supporting the Picuris orogeny.

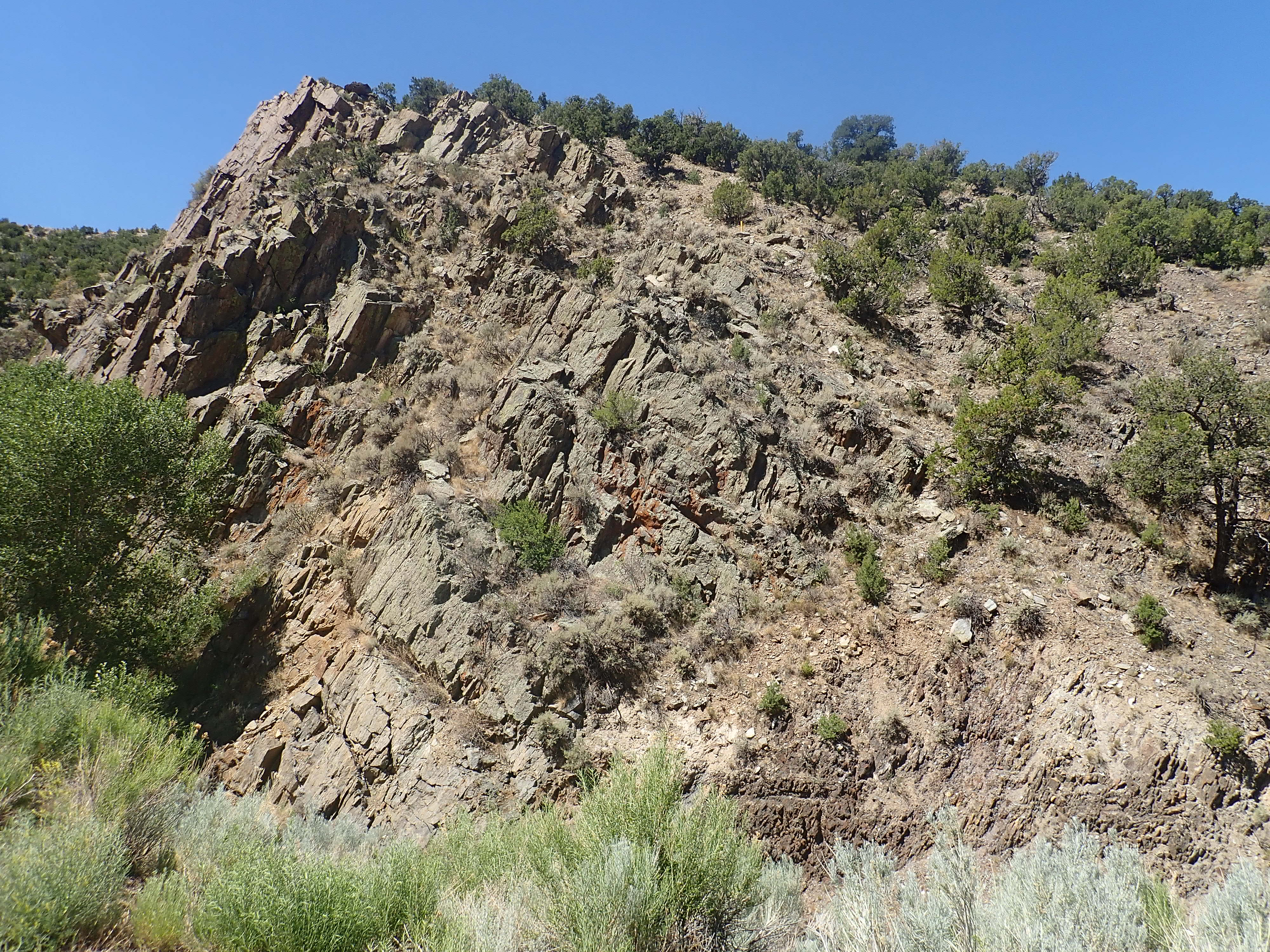
Piedra Lumbre Formation, upper left, in contact with thinner beds of Pilar Formation, lower right

== History of investigation ==
The unit was originally mapped as part of the Rinconada Schist Member of the Ortega Formation by Arthur Montgomery in 1958., which it resembles except for having less abundant garnet. Nielsen recognized in 1972 that the beds were distinct from the upper Rinconada Schist but erroneously assigned them to the Pilar Formation. Long assigned these beds to the Piedra Lumbre Formation in 1976, naming the unit after the Cañada de Piedra Lumbre.
