= Pilar Formation =

Geologic formation in New Mexico, United States

- Stratigraphic range: Calymmian
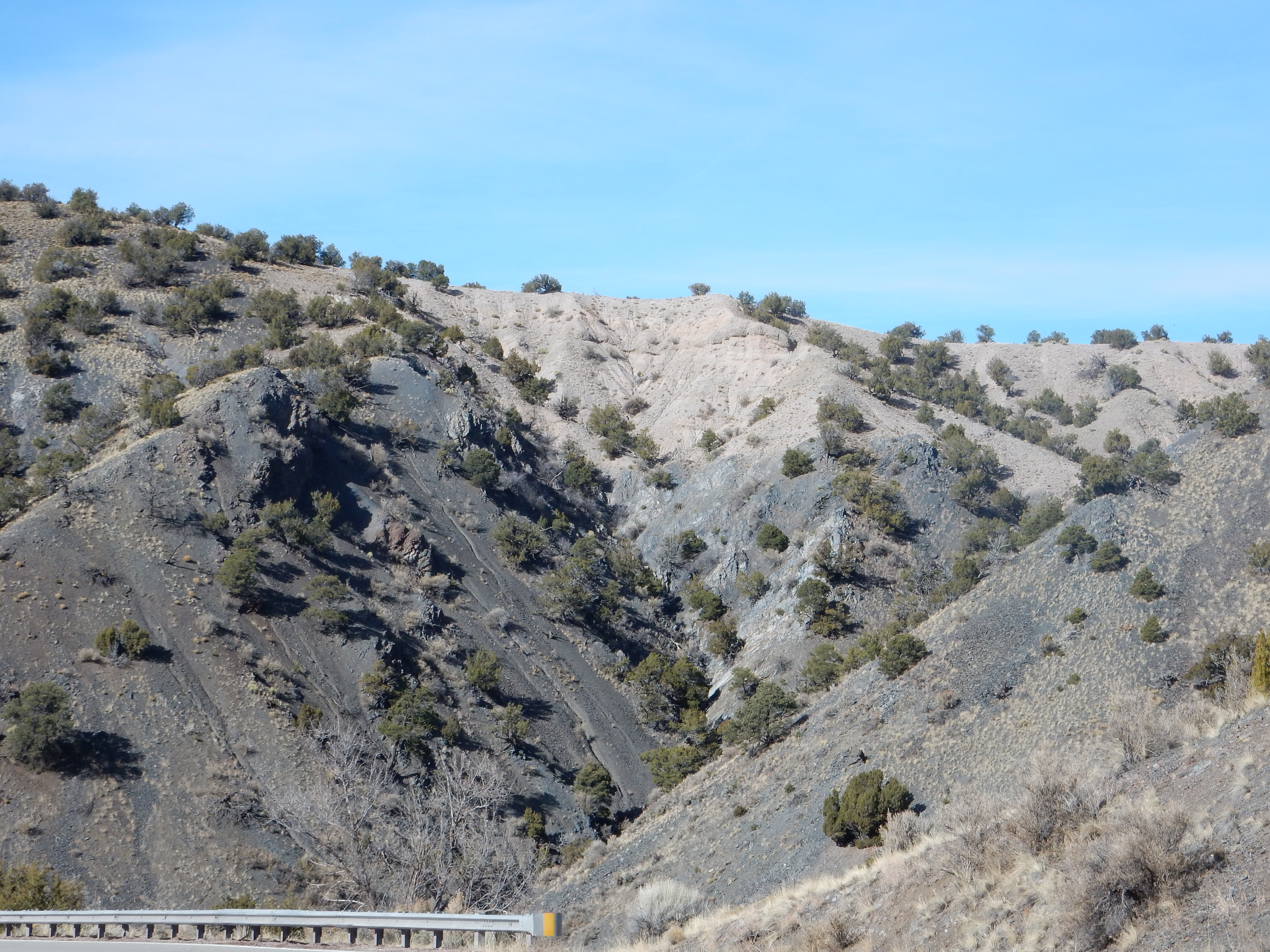
- Pilar Formation carbonaceous phyllite beds near Pilar, New Mexico.
- Type: Formation
- Unit of: Trampas Group
- Underlies: Piedra Lumbre Formation
- Overlies: Rinconada Formation
- Thickness: 700 m (2,300 ft)

Lithology
- Primary: Phyllite
- Other: Schist

Location
- Coordinates: 36.211°N 105.827°W
- Region: Picuris Mountains, New Mexico
- Country: United States

Type section
- Named for: Pilar, New Mexico
- Named by: Montgomery
- Year defined: 1953
- Pilar Formation (the United States) Pilar Formation (New Mexico)

The Pilar Formation is a geologic formation that crops out in the Picuris Mountains of northern New Mexico. It has a radiometric age of 1488 ± 6 million years, corresponding to the Calymmian period.

== Description ==
The Pilar Formation consists of a dense gray-black to black hard carbonaceous phyllite or schist with thin white schistose layers that are interpreted as a metatuff. The rock has very irregular slaty cleavage, with tiny muscovite flakes visible in the hand lens. It contains many quartz veins and some limonite augens. Its composition is 50% to 75% quartz and 15% to 30% muscovite with carbonaceous material finely disseminated throughout the quartz and muscovite grains. Montgomery rejected its designation as a slate, as it has undergone middle-grade metarmophism along with the underlying staurolite-bearing Rinconada Formation.

A metamorphosed tuff bed in the Pilar Formation yields an age of 1488 ± 6 Mya, considerably younger than the Rinconada Formation. This suggests that the Pilar Formation and Piedra Lumbre Formation should be removed from the Hondo Group (and placed in the informal Trampas Group) and provides evidence supporting the Picuris orogeny.

The base of the formation is 2-3 meters of garnet-bearing quartzite that is blue-black in color. The total thickness is 700 m (2,300 ft). The contact with the underlying Rinconada Formation is an unconformity representing a 200 million year gap, while the contact with the overlying Piedra Lumbre Formation is gradational. Because of its distinctive appearance, the formation is an important structural marker, which provided evidence that the Hondo Group of which it is a part fills an inverted syncline. Its carbon content is one of the earliest traces of life in northern New Mexico.

== History of investigation ==
The formation was originally designated as the Hondo Slate by Evan Just in his 1937 survey of pegmatites in northern New Mexico. However, this name conflicted with other unit names, and it was renamed the Pilar Phyllite Member of the Ortega Formation by Arthur Montgomery in 1953 Bauer and Williams promoted it to formation rank within the Vadito Group in their sweeping revision of the stratigraphy of northern New Mexico in 1989. With the realization that the formation was much younger than the lower Vadito Group, the formation was reassigned to the Trampas Group by Christopher G. Daniel and coinvestigators in 2013.

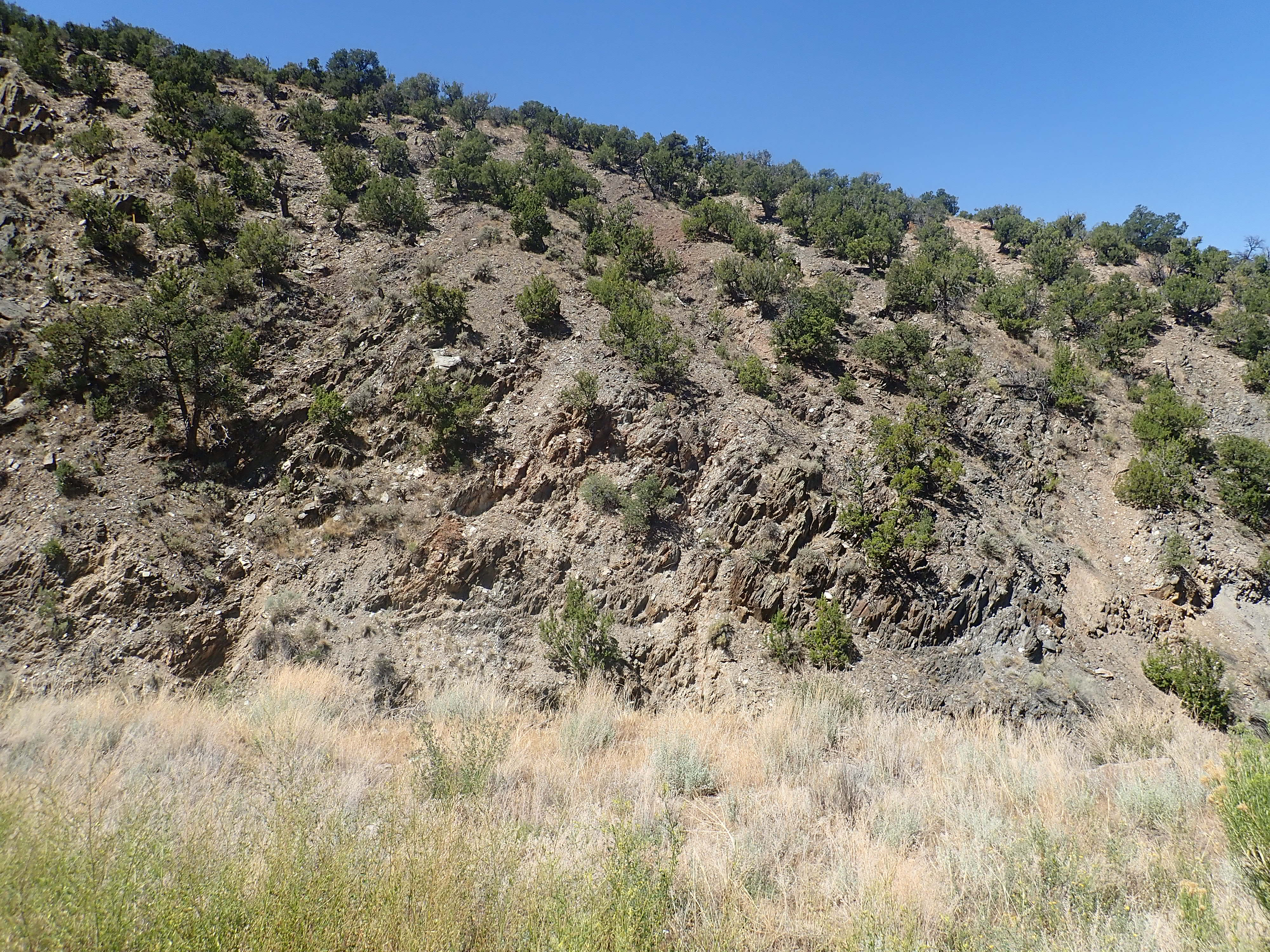
Pilar Formation exposures on Arroyo del Plomo

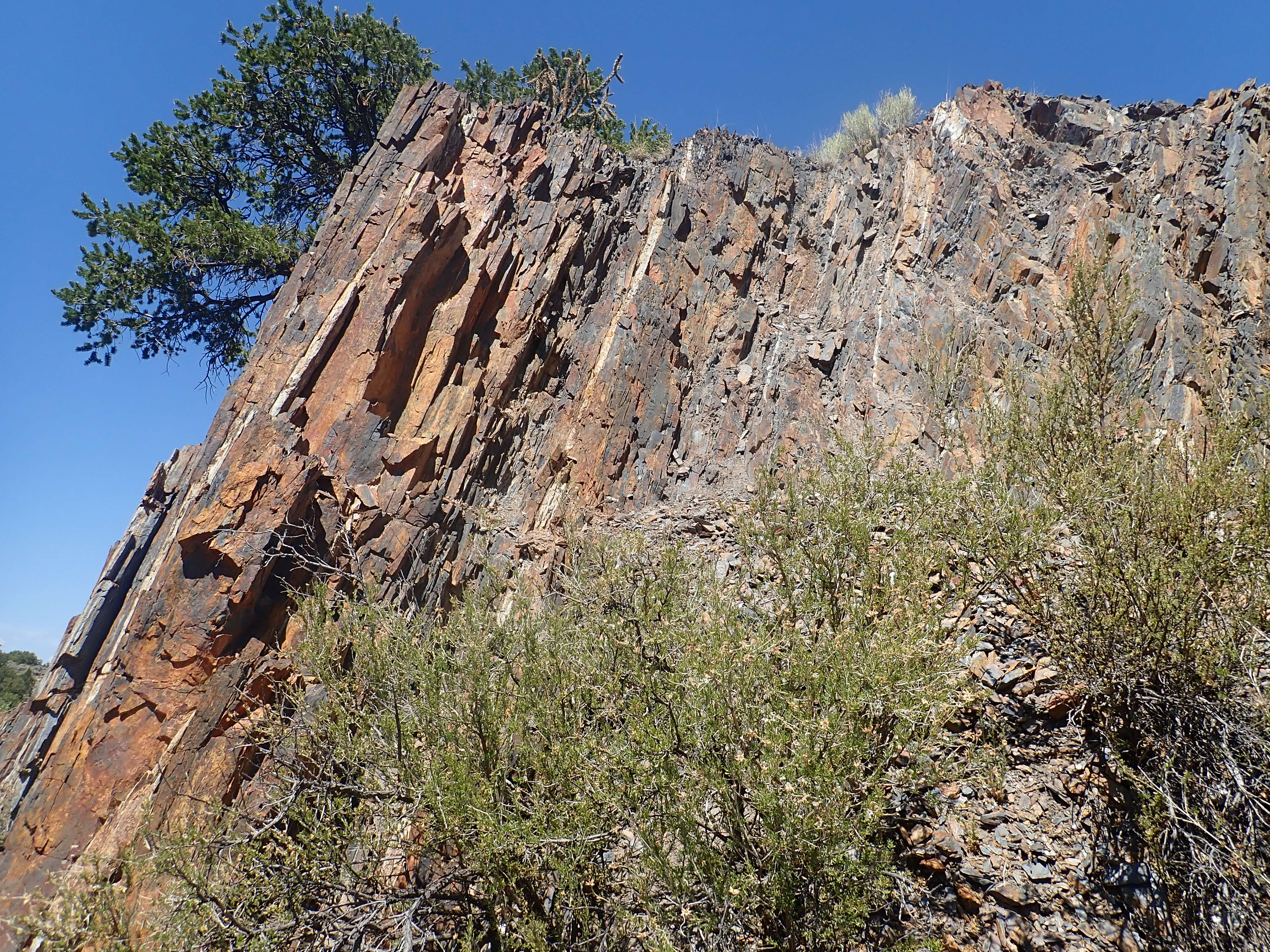
Outcrop of Pilar Formation showing metatuff beds (white layers)

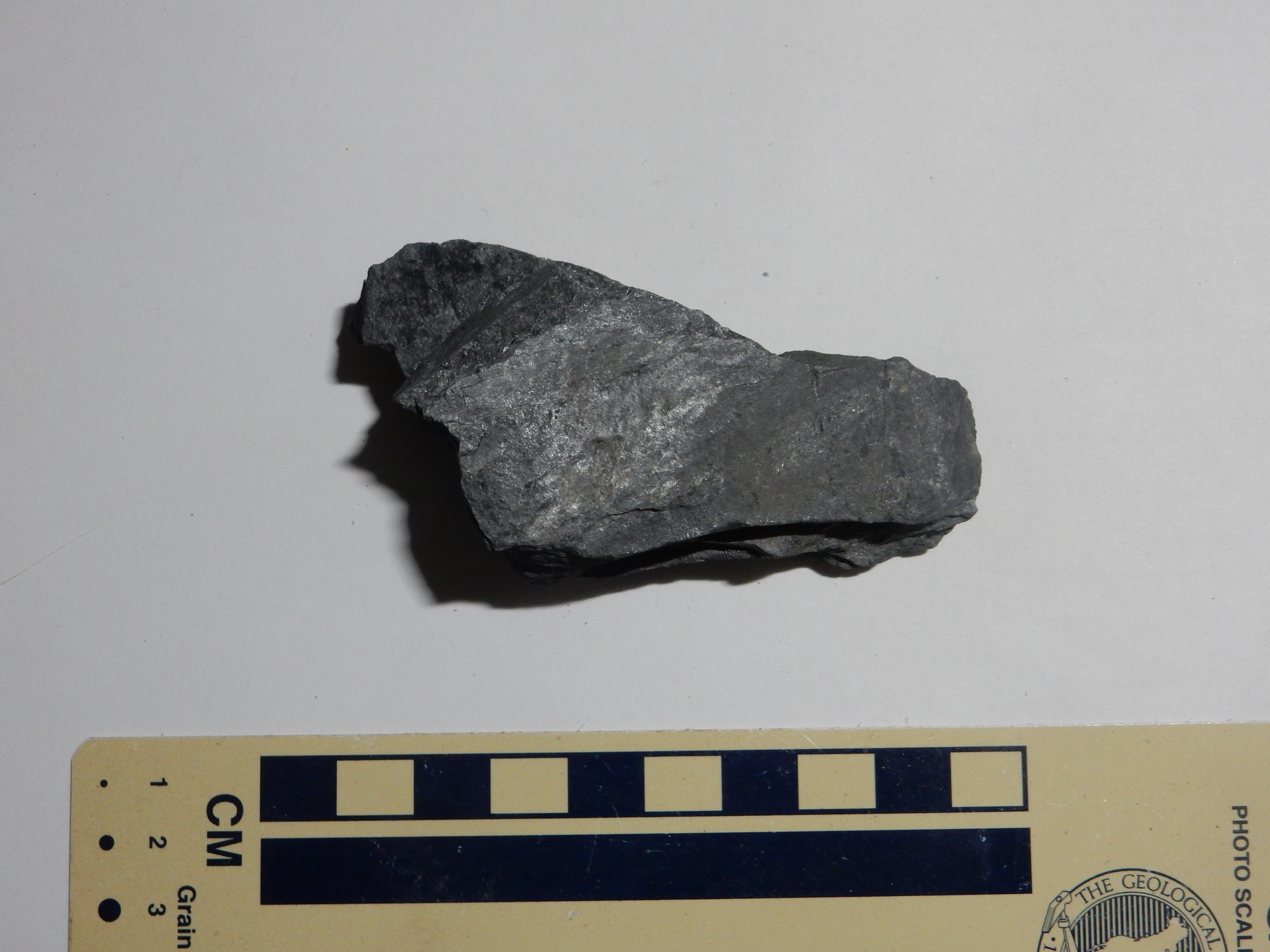
Sample of carbonaceous phyllite from the Pilar Formation
