= Ortega Formation =

Geologic formation in New Mexico, US

- Stratigraphic range: Statherian
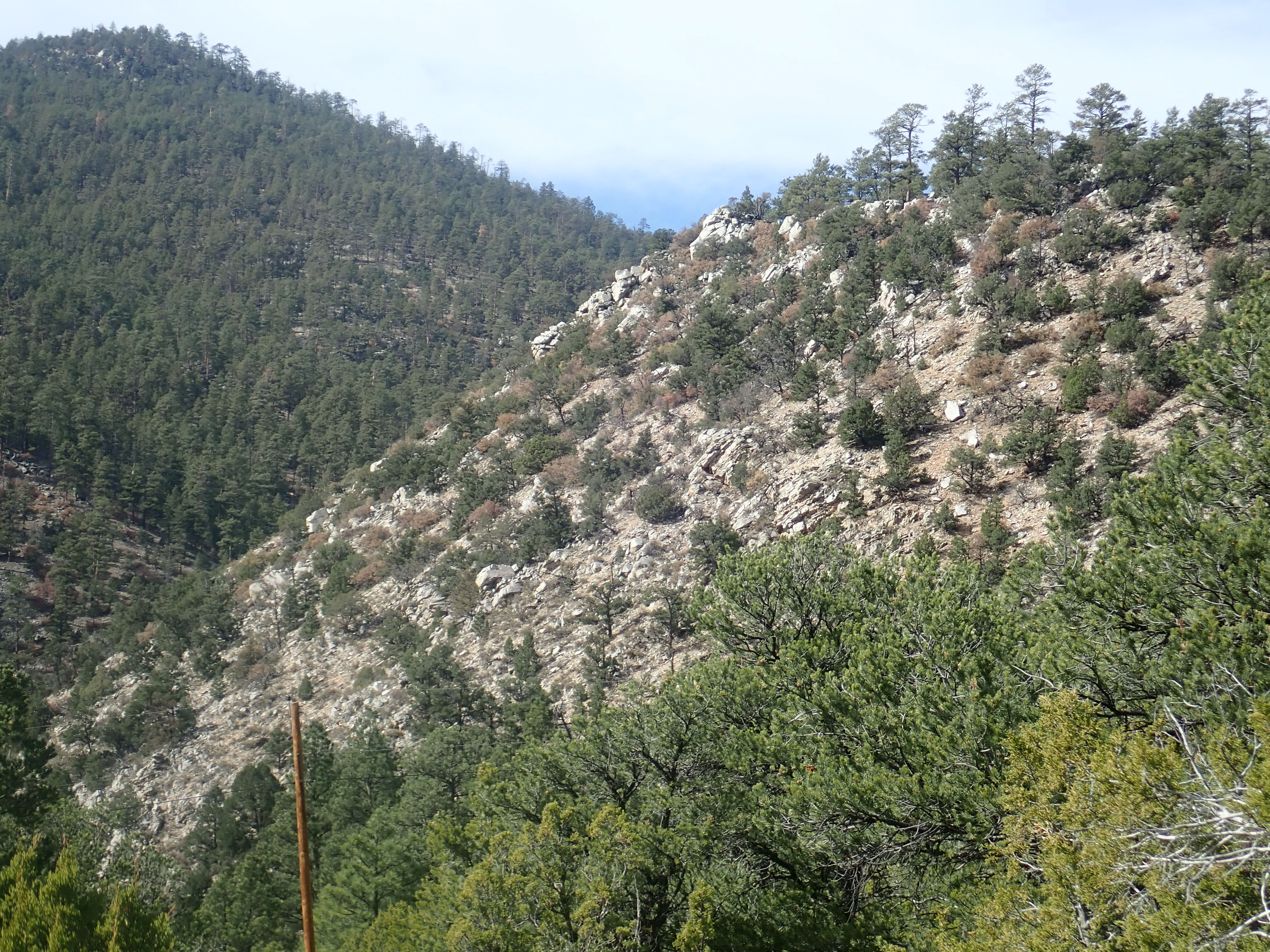
- Ortega Formation at its type section near Ancones, New Mexico
- Type: Formation
- Unit of: Hondo Group
- Underlies: Rinconada Formation
- Overlies: Vadito Group
- Thickness: 8,000 m (26,000 ft)

Lithology
- Primary: Quartzite
- Other: Metaconglomerate

Location
- Coordinates: 36°26′28″N 106°04′26″W
- Region: Tusas and Picuris Mountains, New Mexico
- Country: United States

Type section
- Named for: Ortega Mountains
- Named by: Just
- Year defined: 1937
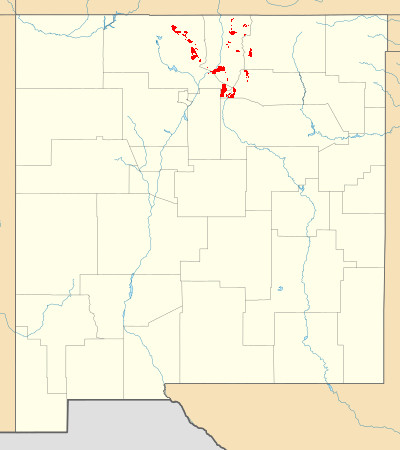
- Ortega Formation (New Mexico) Ortega Formation outcrops in New Mexico

The Ortega Formation is a geologic formation that crops out in most of the mountain ranges of northern New Mexico. Detrital zircon geochronology establishes a maximum age for the formation of 1690-1670 million years (Mya), in the Statherian period of the Precambrian.

== Description ==
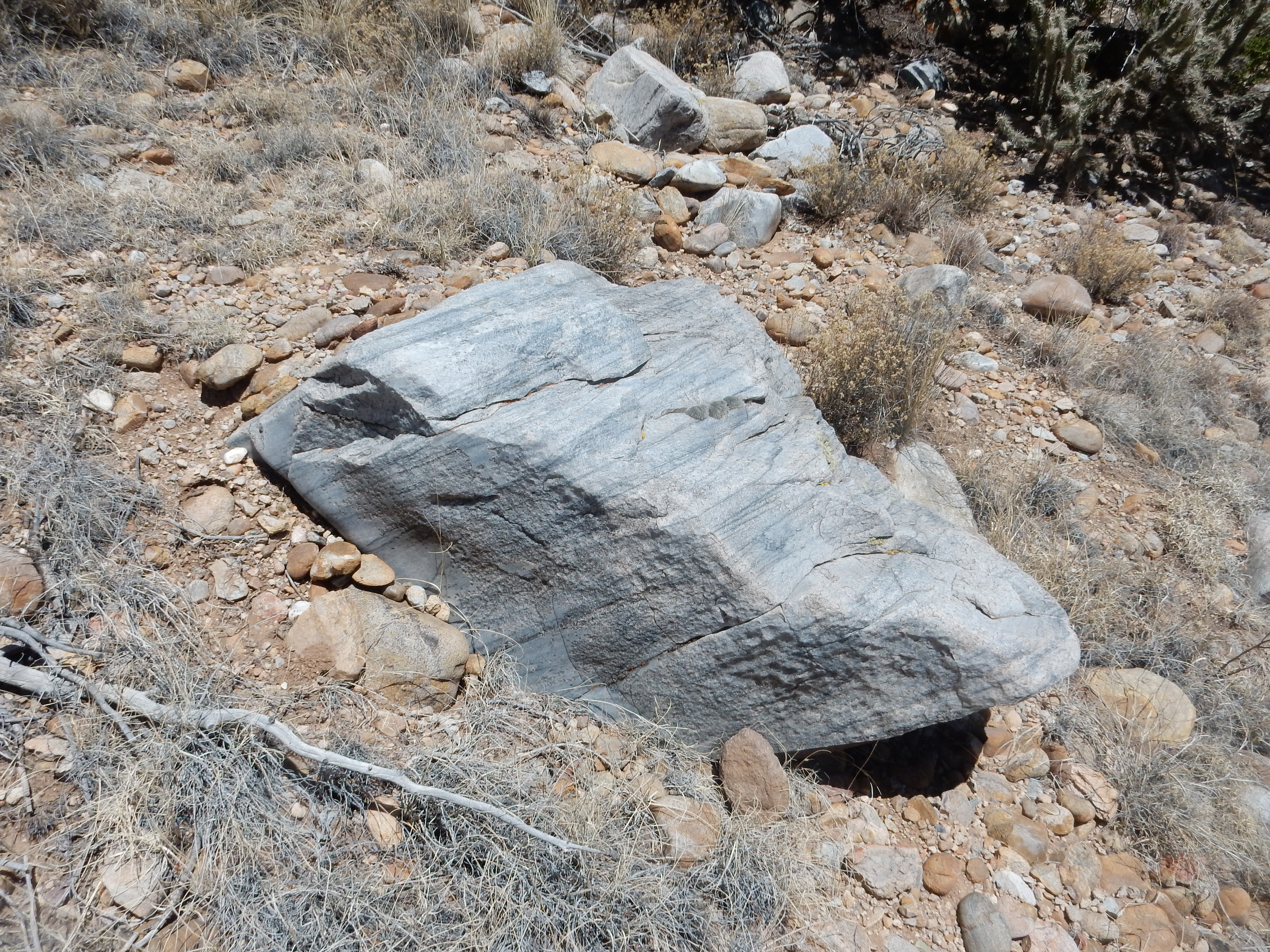
Boulder of Ortega Formation near Ancones, New Mexico

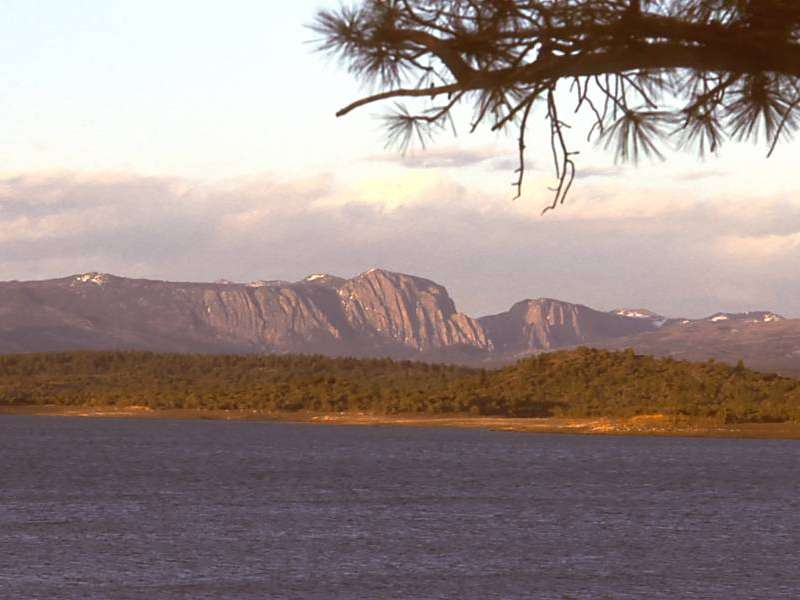
Massive exposures of Ortega Formation underlie the Brazos Cliffs

The Ortega Formation consists of a very clean (98% modal quartz), typically bluish-white, quartzite, with some beds near the base of the formation composed of metaconglomerate. Crossbedding is found throughout the formation, and aluminosilicate minerals are abundant within the formation. These show that its lower beds were buried deeply enough to be metamorphosed to the sillimanite facies, at temperatures of over 500 °C (930 °F). The Ortega Formation is the principal ridge-forming formation of the Picuris Mountains and is a uniform 800–1,200 meters (3,000–4,000 ft) thick.

The contact between the Ortega Formation and the underlying Vadito Group is fairly easy to trace using a regional manganese-rich marker bed in the uppermost Vadito Group. This is a ductile shear zone associated either with mountain collapse at the end of the Mazatzal orogeny or tectonics of the Picuris orogeny that resulted in south-directed displacement of the Ortega Formation over the Glenwoody Formation. Structurally, the Ortega Formation tends to form stiff limbs within which weaker formations are heavily distorted. The Ortega Formation is quite uniform in thickness everywhere but the northern Picuris Mountains, where its thickness appears to have been doubled by tectonic imbrication.

The Ortega Formation may correlate with the Uncompahgre Formation of Colorado, the Mazatzal Group in Arizona, and other Proterozoic quartzite successions associated with the Yavapai and Mazatzal orogenies. These all appear to be first cycle sandstones, in which the individual sand grains have eroded out of igneous or metamorphic rock rather than been recycled from older sedimentary rock. Their remarkable maturity (they were formed from nearly pure quartz grains) may be a result of deep weathering processes acting on the original sediment beds under unusual Proterozoic conditions.

The formation is interpreted as the first stage of a marine transgression on a southward-dipping siliciclastic shelf. This was likely part of a back-arc basin associated with the Yavapai orogeny, named the Pilar basin. Tabular cross-bedding permits the orientation of the highly distorted beds to be determined.

== History of investigation ==
The unit was named by Evan Just in 1937 during his investigation of pegmatites in northern New Mexico. Just included the entire sequence of quartzite and quartz schist in the Picuris Mountains in his definition, assigning the schist to the Rinconada schist member, and including the feldspathic Petaca Schist in the Tusas Mountains. Arthur Montgomery recognized the Rinconada schist as well but included the Pilar slate in the Ortega Formation while assigning some of the schist and conglomerate beds to his Vadito Formation. During mapping of the Las Tablas area, Barker redefined the Ortega Quartzite to include only the quartzite and basal conglomerate beds. In their sweeping revision of the Precambrian stratigraphy of Northern New Mexico, Bauer and Williams split the Glenwoody Formation from the Ortega Formation and defined the Ortega Formation to consist only of the massive quartzite and basal conglomerate beds while reassigning the Petaca Schist mostly to the Vadito Group (Burned Mountain Formation).
