= New Mexico aulacogen =

Failed rift in New Mexico and southern Colorado

New Mexico Aulacogen
- Stratigraphic range: Cambrian-Ordovician

Location
- Coordinates: 35°N 106°W.
- Country: United States

The New Mexico Aulacogen (ah-lah-coh-jin) is a failed rift, or failed rift arm (aulacogen), that may have formed during the Cambrian and Ordovician Periods in the area from central Colorado through southern New Mexico. Its presence is inferred from pervasive alkaline and carbonatite intrusions of this age in this area. These include the Iron Hill carbonatite complex of central Colorado. A smaller alkali-carbonatite complex at Lobo Hill returns an Ar-Ar age of 518 ± 5.7 million years. The Florida Mountains uplift took place at about this same time and may be associated with this aulacogen.

Among the dikes associated with the postulated aulacogen are episyenite dikes in southern New Mexico believed to have formed from circulation of alkali-rich fluids through the host rock. Clasts of episyenite are found in the Bliss Formation, suggesting the dikes formed prior to late Cambrian. Some of the dikes contain heavy rare-earth elements in sufficient concentrations to be potentially exploitable. Episyenites found in the Zuni Mountains and the alkaline-carbonatite complex at Lobo Hill both lack the valuable concentrations of rare-earth elements.

The New Mexico aulacogen may be associated with a rift extending from Oklahoma to Colorado.
