= Allamoore Formation =

Precambrian geologic formation in Texas

- Stratigraphic range: Ectasian
- Type: Formation
- Underlies: Tumbledown Formation
- Overlies: Carrizo Formation
- Thickness: 3,000 feet (910 m)

Lithology
- Primary: Limestone
- Other: Chert, metavolcanic rock

Location
- Coordinates: 31.078°N 105.004°W
- Region: West Texas
- Country: United States

Type section
- Named for: Allamoore, Texas
- Named by: P.B. King
- Year defined: 1940
- Allamoore Formation (the United States) Allamoore Formation (Texas)

The Allamoore Formation is a Precambrian geologic formation found in the vicinity of Van Horn, Texas. The formation is notable for the well-preserved microfossils found in chert beds within the formation. These may include early eukaryotes. Possible fossil burrows were reported in the formation in 1995, which would push the origin of the first animals (Metazoa) back to before 1000 million years ago. However, these have since been explained as diagenetic structures, formed by nonbiological processes as the sediments making up the formation were compacted and lithified.

== Description ==
The Allamoore Formation consists of blue to brown thinly bedded limestone with interbedded chert seams. Masses of metavolcanic rock are also found within the formation, including metamorphosed basalts and tuffs that were once lava flows and volcanic ash beds. The formation is exposed only in a folded belt near Van Horn, Texas, where tectonic process tilted the beds nearly vertical. This exposed a thickness of over 3,000 feet (910 m) of limestone beds. The formation overlies the Carrizo Formation and is in turn overlain by the Tumbledown Formation.

The age of the Allamoore Formation is estimated at 1250 million years, based on radiometric dating of ash beds within the formation. The formation is thought to have been deposited during the Grenville Orogeny, when another continent (likely Africa) collided with North America. This led to the opening of rift basins along the southern margin of North America, where sediments accumulated. The sediments making up the Allamoore Formation largely escaped the severe metamorphism that affected most of the sedimentary rock laid down during the orogeny. This makes the formation a valuable window into conditions at that time.

== Fossils ==
The chert beds of the Allamoore Formation contain exceptionally well-preserved microfossils. These were part of mat-building communities of microbes (stromatolites) that lived in shallow water and were occasionally exposed to air. The microorganisms were preserved in fine-grained chert shortly after their remains were buried in sediments. They appear to be mostly cyanobacteria, members of the families Entophysalidaceae and Chroococcaceae. The chert also preserves tubular remains of organisms resembling the modern Oscillatoria and other filamentary prokaryotes. The chert contains well-preserved large spheroidal cells exceeding 100 microns in diameter, which may be early examples of red or green eukaryotic algae.

In 1995, a team of researchers reported the presence of sediment-filled tubes in the formation. These were interpreted as fossil burrows of very early animals. If confirmed, the finding would push the origin of animal life back to before 1000 million years ago. However, the structures have since been interpreted as pseudo-traces, sedimentary structures formed in the sediments by inorganic processes as the sediments were converted to solid rock (diagenesis).

== History of investigation ==
The beds assigned to the formation were originally part of the (now-defunct) Millican Formation. They were assigned to the Allamoore Formation in 1940 by Philip B. King and named for exposures near the Allamoore Post Office.
