= Tumbledown Formation =

Precambrian geologic formation in Texas

- Stratigraphic range: Ectasian
- Type: Formation
- Underlies: Hazel Formation
- Overlies: Allamoore Formation
- Thickness: 160 meters (520 ft)

Lithology
- Primary: Basalt, volcaniclastics
- Other: Limestone

Location
- Coordinates: 31.141°N 104.883°W
- Region: West Texas
- Country: United States

Type section
- Named for: Tumbledown Mountain, Texas
- Named by: Soegaard and Callahan
- Year defined: 1994
- Tumbledown Formation (the United States) Tumbledown Formation (Texas)

The Tumbledown Formation is a Precambrian geologic formation found in the vicinity of Van Horn, Texas. The formation consists of volcaniclastic rock (sedimentary rock composed of fragments of volcanic rock) interbedded with basalt lava flows. It is notable as part of an almost undeformed sequence of ancient rock beds in the otherwise highly deformed orogenic belt of the Grenville orogeny, which gives geologists a window on conditions on Earth around 1200 to 1100 million years ago.

== Description ==
The formation consists of about 160 meters (520 ft) of basalt flows and agglomerate and volcanic sandstone. Basalt makes up over half the formation, with volcanic sandstone making up most of the rest, with less than 10% of the formation consisting of cherty limestone and other rock types. The base of the formation contains clasts (fragments) of carbonate rock weathered from the underlying Allamoore Formation, from which the Tumbledown Formation is separated by an irregular erosional surface. The Tumbledown Formation is likewise separated from the overlying Hazel Formation by an erosional surface, with clasts of Tumbledown rock presente at the base of the Hazel Formation. At the type section at Tumbledown Mountain, the Tumbledown Formation dips 35 degrees to the south but is otherwise undeformed. Exposures in the nearby Millican Hills are much more severely deformed.

Radiometric dating of the underlying Allamoore Formation and of a volcanic bed near the top of the Tumbledown Formation constrains the age of the Tumbledown Formation to between 1265 and 1243 million years old, in the late Ectasian Period.

The Tumbledown Formation and other formations in the Van Horn area are associated with the Grenville orogeny, but are unusually well preserved, with some exposures showing little deformation and a relatively low degree of metamorphism. They are thought to have been deposited in a rift basin produced by transcurrent faulting, similar to the modern San Andreas Fault. This fault system likely extended across southern Laurentia (the ancient core of North America) and also included rock of similar age in the Franklin Mountains, in the Apache Group of Arizona, and the Pahrump Group in Death Valley. A second possibility is that the rift basins were an extension of the Midcontinent Rift, a rift system that formed in the Great Lakes region 1100 million years ago and extends to the southwest.

== History of investigation ==
The beds making up the formation were originally assigned to the underlying Allamoore Formation. However, in 1994, Soegaard and Callahan separated these beds into a new Tumbledown Formation, based on evidence of a major disconformity separating these beds from the beds below. A type section was designated at Tumbledown Mountain northeast of Van Horn, Texas.
