= Rinconada Formation =

Geologic formation in New Mexico, US

- Stratigraphic range: Statherian
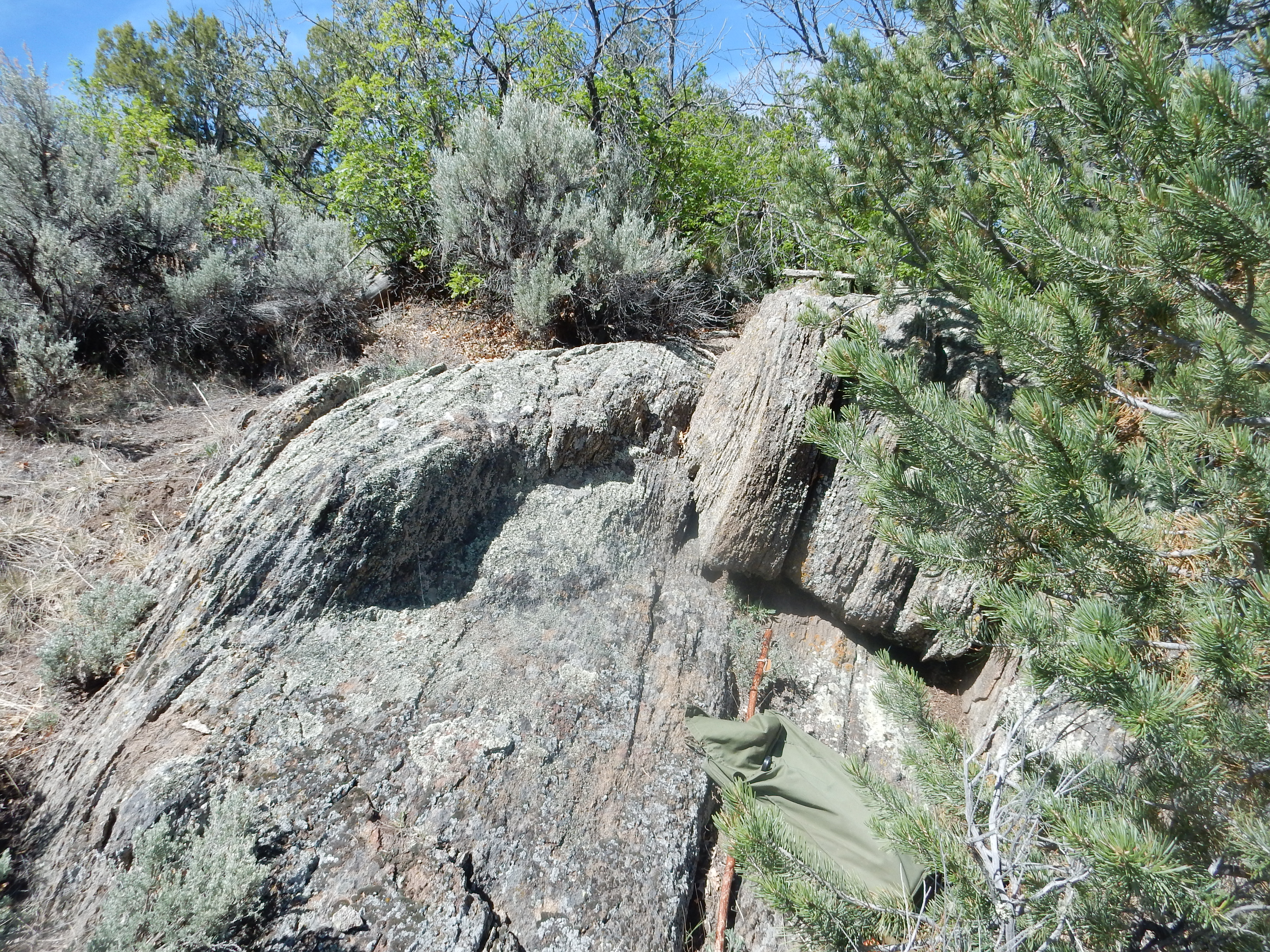
- Rinconada Formation garnet-staurolite-muscovite schist beds near Pilar, New Mexico.
- Type: Formation
- Unit of: Hondo Group
- Underlies: Pilar Formation
- Overlies: Ortega Formation
- Thickness: 600 m (2,000 ft)

Lithology
- Primary: Schist
- Other: Quartzite

Location
- Coordinates: 36.2144591°N 105.8030674°W
- Region: Picuris Mountains, New Mexico
- Country: United States

Type section
- Named for: Village of Rinconada (36°25′43″N 106°07′02″W)
- Named by: Just
- Year defined: 1937
- Rinconada Formation (the United States) Rinconada Formation (New Mexico)

The Rinconada Formation is a geologic formation that crops out in the Picuris Mountains of northern New Mexico. Detrital zircon geochronology establishes a maximum age for the Rinconada Formation of about 1723 Mya, placing it in the Statherian period of the Precambrian.

== Description ==
The formation consists of gray to buff quartz-muscovite schist with some interbedded quartzite and metaconglomerate. which fills an inverted syncline in the northern Picuris Mountains. It is missing from the Hondo Group in the Tusas Mountains. Detrital zircon geochronology establishes a minimum age for the Rinconada Formation of 1762 Mya. However, this reflects the crystallization age of the source rocks, and the true age is likely closer to 1723 Mya based on zircon ages in the underlying Ortega Formation. This indicates a shift in source region between the Ortega Formation and the Rinconada Formation.

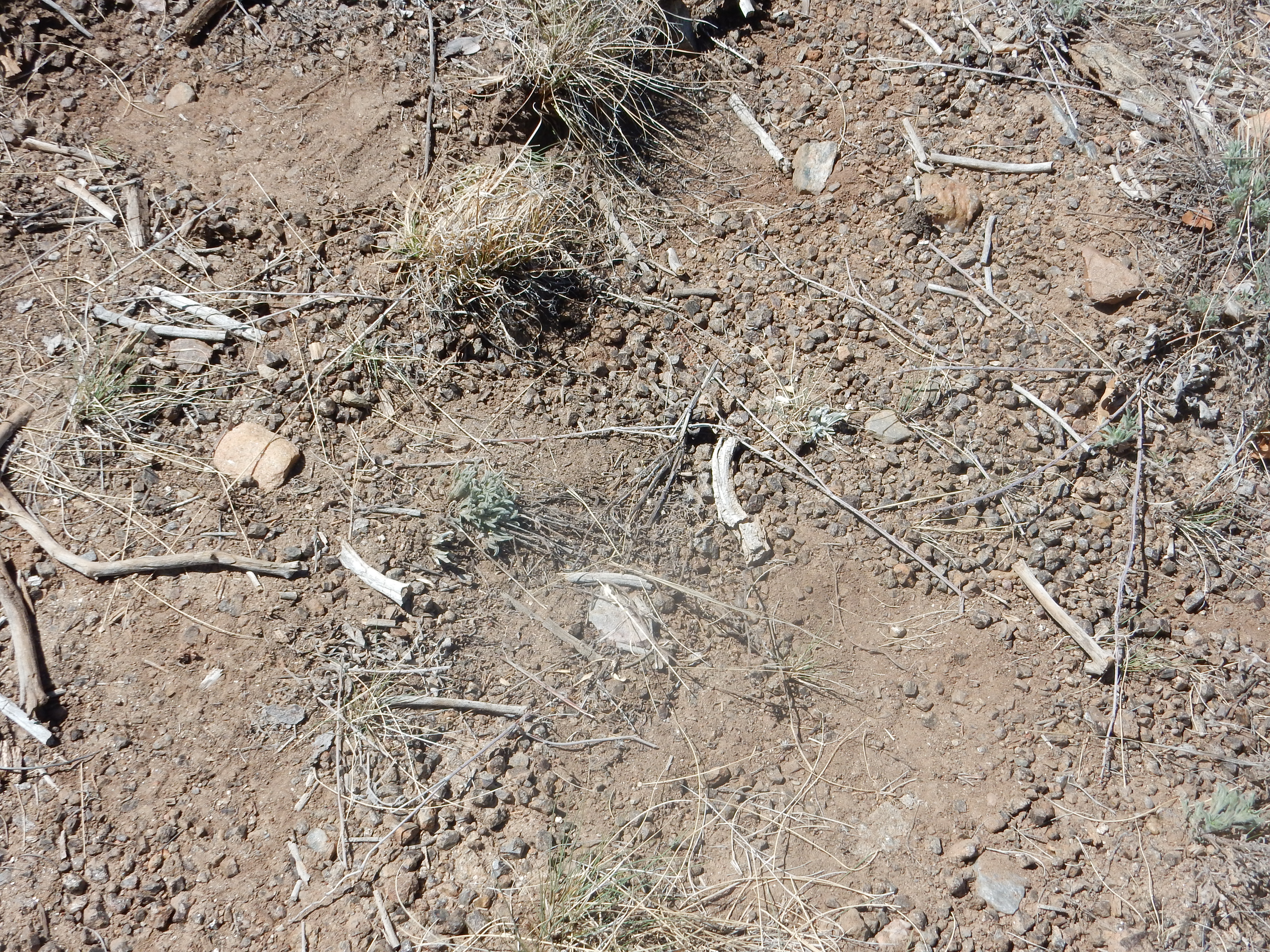
Crystals of staurolite weathered out of the Rinconada Formation, near Pilar, New Mexico.

The formation is divided into three informal members. The first is composed of staurolite gneiss and schist, from 60 meters (200 feet) to 150 meters (490 feet) thick, which contains porphyroblasts of garnet and staurolite up to 4 centimeters (1.6 in) long. Most of the staurolite from these beds is twinned, and the large crystals are prized by mineral collectors. Where the schist is heavily micaceous and easily eroded, the ground surface is covered with weathered-out staurolite crystals. This member includes spotty basal andalusite-biotite hornfels, from 65 meters (213 feet) to 120 meters (390 feet) thick, consisting of biotite crystals up to 1 centimetre (0.39 inches) in size in a coarsely felted mass of muscovite and quarts. This includes knots of quartz and andalusite up to 25 centimetres (9.8 inches) in diameter.

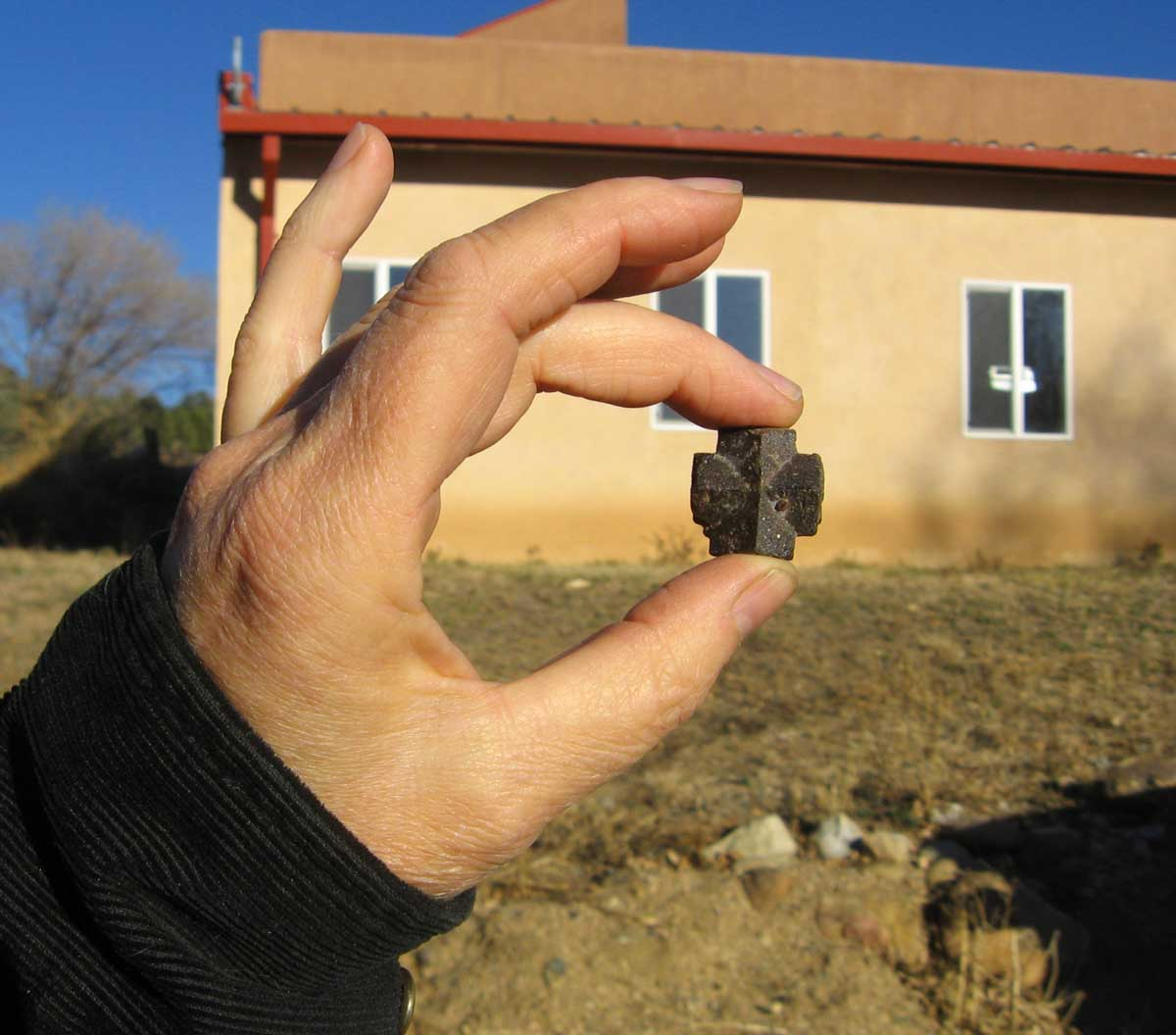
Twinned staurolite from Rinconada Formation

The staurolite likely crystallized out at a temperature of 532 ± 20 °C and about 3,700 bar total pressure under conditions of water undersaturation.

The second member is a gray-white quartzite, 60 meters (200 feet) to 180 meters (590 feet) thick, with slabby jointing and devoid of sillimanite and kyanite. The third member is a muscovite-rich phyllite with a pearly to greenish gray sheen containing small staurolite and garnet crystals.

The Rinconada Formation is separated from the overlying Pilar Formation by an unconformity representing a gap in geologic time of 200 million years.

The Rinconada Formation is interpreted as deltaic, fluvial, and shallow marine deposition of the regressive sequence of a marine transgression. This was likely part of the northern coast of a back-arc basin associated with the Yavapai orogeny, named the Pilar basin. The quartzite at the upper contact with the Pilar Formation then represents renewed transgression.

== History of investigation ==
The beds making up the unit were originally assigned to the Ortega quartzite by Evan Just during his 1937 survey of pegmatites in northern New Mexico. Evan gave the informal name, Rinconada schist, to these beds and noted the presence of staurolite porphyroblasts. Montgomery formalized the designation of the mixed schist and quartzite beds as the Rinconada member of the Ortega Formation in 1953. The Rinconada Member was promoted to independent formation status by Bauer and Williams in their sweeping revision of the Precambrian stratigraphy of northern New Mexico in 1987.
