= Hondo Group =

Group of geologic formations in New Mexico, US

- Stratigraphic range: Statherian
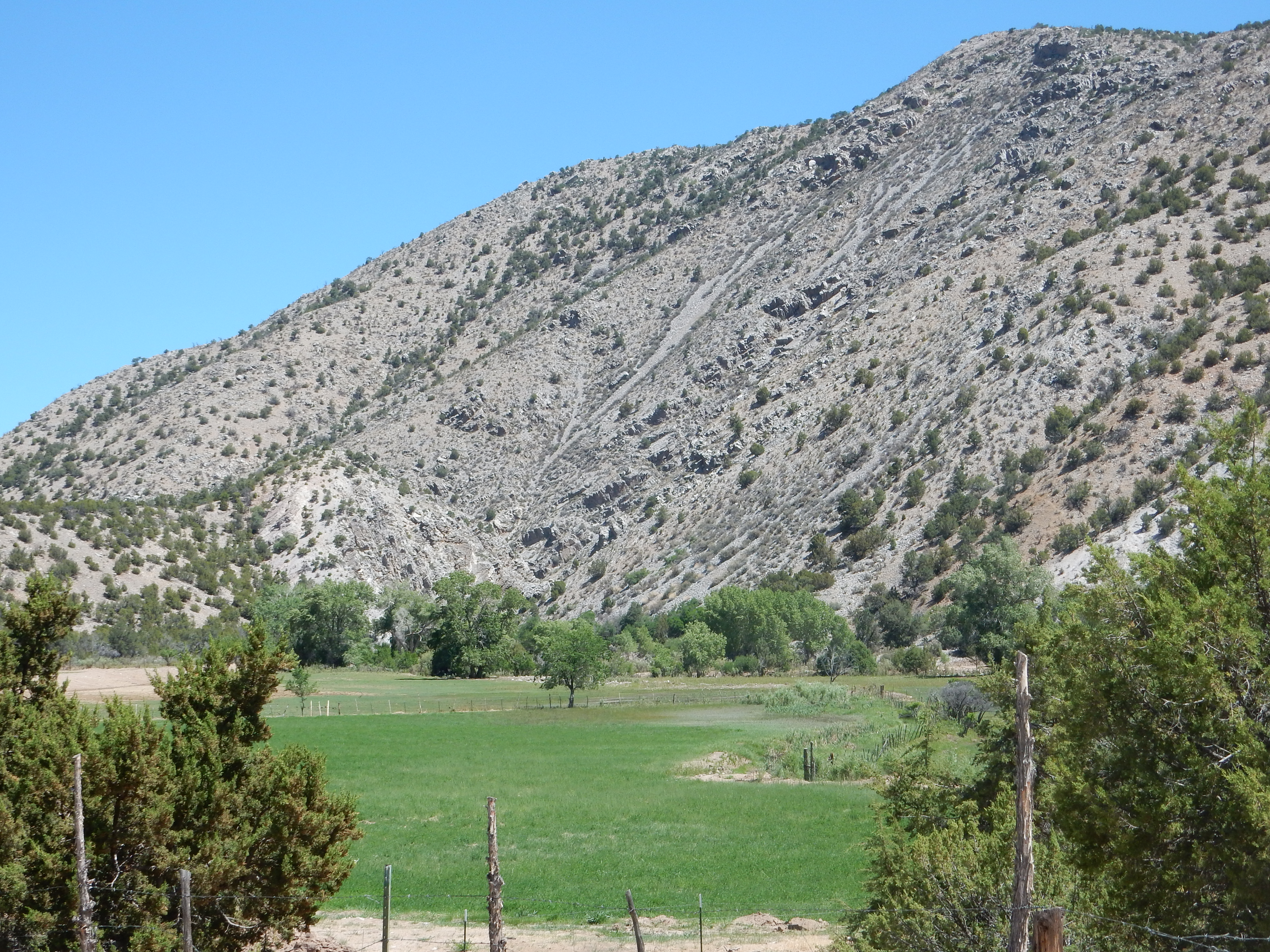
- Hondo Group (Ortega Formation) in the Tusas Mountains, New Mexico
- Type: Group
- Sub-units: Ortega Formation, Rinconada Formation
- Underlies: Pilar Formation
- Overlies: Vadito Group
- Thickness: 2,200 m (7,200 ft)

Lithology
- Primary: Metasedimentary rock

Location
- Coordinates: 36.246°N 105.745°W
- Region: Picuris Mountains, New Mexico
- Country: United States

Type section
- Named for: Hondo Canyon
- Named by: Bauer and Williams
- Year defined: 1989
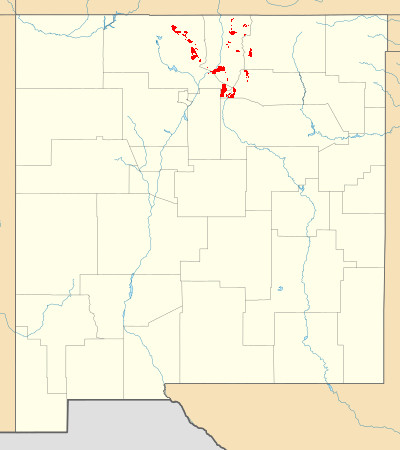
- Hondo Group (New Mexico) Map of Hondo Group outcrops

The Hondo Group is a group of geologic formations that crops out in most of the Precambrian-cored uplifts of northern New Mexico. Detrital zircon geochronology gives a maximum age for the lower Hondo Group of 1765 to 1704 million years (Mya), corresponding to the Statherian period.

== Geology ==
The Hondo Group consists of a lower very clean quartzite (the Ortega Formation) and upper schists, quartzites, and slates. The total thickness is about 2,200 meters (7,200 feet). The upper section is absent in the Tusas Mountains, where the Hondo Group is essentially synonymous with the Ortega Formation. The upper section is assigned to the Rinconada Formation in the Picuris Mountains. The most complete section is in the northern Picuris Mountains, where the Hondo Group fills an overturned syncline. Detrital zircon geochronology establishes an age for the lower Hondo Group of 1765 to 1704 Mya.

The Pilar and Piedra Lumbre Formations were originally included in the Hondo Group. However, a metamorphosed tuff bed in the Pilar Formation yields an age of 1488 ± 6 Mya, considerably younger than the Ortega Quartzite. The Piedra Lumbre Formation likewise contains zircons dated to 1425 Mya. This suggests that the Pilar Formation and Piedra Lumbre Formation should be removed from the Hondo Group, and provides evidence supporting the Picuris orogeny.

The Hondo Group lies structurally below the Vadito Group in the Picuris Mountains. However, both groups have been severely deformed and metamorphosed, and the Vadito Group is thought to actually be the older of the two groups. Cross-bedding indicates that the Vadito Group has been overturned. The contact between the two groups is fairly easy to trace using a regional manganese-rich marker bed in the uppermost Vadito Group, which may have formed by syngenetic deposition from hydrothermal fluids, or a more general manganese enrichment of basin waters at the close of Vadito volcanism. Another possibility is that it is a weathering horizon. Either possibility would make it an important regional time marker.

The group is interpreted as fluvial to shallow marine deposition on a southward-dipping siliciclastic shelf. Together, the Vadito Group and lower Hondo Group likely represent deposition in a back-arc basin associated with the Yavapai orogeny, named the Pilar basin.

== Economic geology ==
Gold, silver, and oxidized copper minerals were discovered on Copper Hill around 1900 and prospected over the next five years. The ore minerals were concentrated along the contact between the Ortega and Rinconada Formations. Mining began along the Champion vein on the west side of the hill, with two shaft connected by an adit 100 meters (330 feet) long. However, the mine was unsuccessful. Renewed exploratory drilling in 1982 determined that the deposits are presently uneconomical to mine.

== History of investigation ==
The unit was originally designated as the Ortega Group by Long in 1976, but this caused confusion with the Ortega Formation. The name, Hondo Group, was proposed by Bauer and Williams in 1989 as part of their sweeping revision of the Precambrian stratigraphy of northern New Mexico.
