= Picuris Mountains =

Mountain range in New Mexico, US

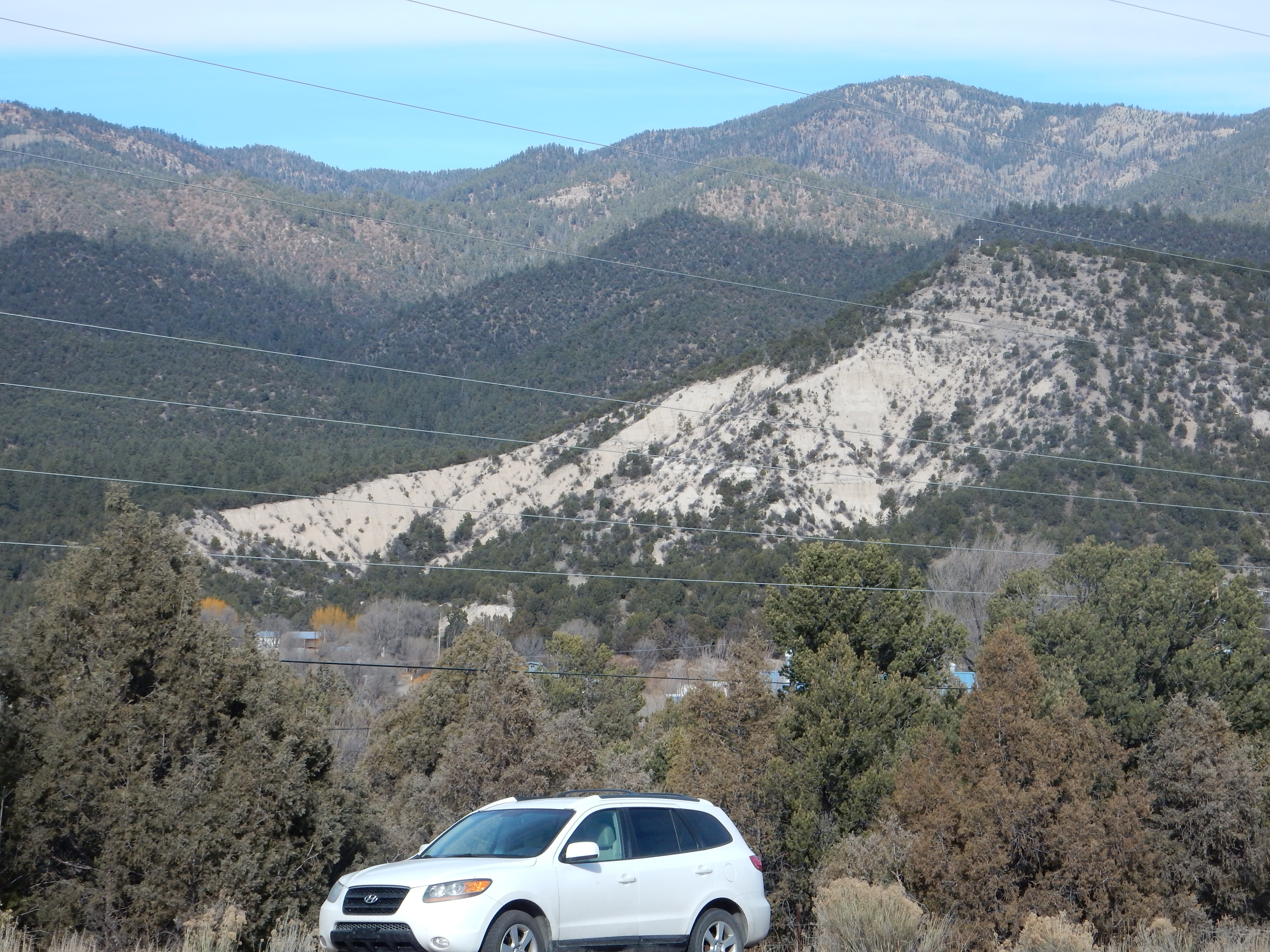
- Picuris Mountains north of Picuris Pueblo, New Mexico

Highest point
- Peak: 10,801 ft (3,292 m), Picuris Peak

Dimensions
- Length: 15 mi (24 km) east-west
- Width: 10 mi (16 km) north-south

Naming
- Etymology: Keres Pee-koo-ree-a, "those who paint"

Geography
- Location within New Mexico
- Country: United States
- State: New Mexico
- Range coordinates: 36°15′N 105°42′W

The Picuris Mountains (Northern Tiwa: Pįene) are a mountain range in northern New Mexico. They are considered a subrange of the Sangre de Cristo Mountains.

== Geography ==
The mountains are located to the east of Dixon and surround Picuris Pueblo to the west, north, and east. The range resembles a triangle with its base to the east, along the valley of the Rio Grande del Rancho. The northwest face lies along the valley of the Rio Grande and the southern face lies along Rio Pueblo and Embudo Creek.

== History ==
The area was first visited by Europeans on July 13, 1598, when Juan de Oñate visited Picuris Pueblo.

== Geology ==
The range is underlain by Precambrian rock beds of the Hondo Group and Vadito Group. It is the namesake for the Picuris orogeny.

== Economy ==
Mining has been historically important in the Picuris Mountains. The Harding Pegmatite Mine was operated off and on from about 1900 to 1958, when it was donated to the University of New Mexico as an outdoor geological laboratory. At one time, the mine made New Mexico the leading producer of beryllium among the United States. Copper has been mined at Copper Hill north of the Harding Mine. Other commodities historically mined in the range include tungsten, optical calcite, bismuth, and aluminosilicates. As of 2004, the MICA mine was the only producer of muscovite west of the Appalachian Mountains.
