= Mazatzal =

Mazatzal may refer to:

- the Mazatzal Mountains, a mountain range in south central Arizona, from which are named:
  - the Mazatzal Group, a group of geologic formations that crops out in the Mazatzal Mountains, and which gives its name to the Mazatzal orogeny
  - the Mazatzal Wilderness, a wilderness area in Arizona
  - the Mazatzal orogeny, an orogenic event in what is now the Southwestern United States, in the Statherian Period of the Paleoproterozoic
