= Yankee Joe Formation =

Geologic formation in Arizona, US

- Stratigraphic range: Calymmian
- Type: Formation
- Underlies: Blackjack Formation
- Overlies: White Ledges Formation
- Thickness: 900 m (3,000 ft)

Lithology
- Primary: Mudstone
- Other: Arkose, graywacke

Location
- Coordinates: 33.70°N 110.71°W
- Region: Arizona
- Country: United States

Type section
- Named for: Ash Creek
- Named by: D.E. Livingston
- Year defined: 1969
- Yankee Joe Formation (the United States) Yankee Joe Formation (Arizona)

The Yankee Joe Formation is a geological formation exposed in the Blackjack Mountains, Arizona, US. The age of the formation is between 1474 and 1436 million years, and detrital zircon geochronology of its sediments provides clues for reconstruction the supercontinent, Rodinia.

== Description ==
The Yankee Joe Formation consists of 900 meters (3,000 ft) of argillaceous (clay-rich) sediments. Detrital zircon geochronology establishes a minimum age for the formation of 1474 ± 13 million years. The overlying Blackjack Formation is intruded by the Ruin Granite, with a radiometric age of 1436 ± 2 million years, thus constraining the age of the Yankee Joe to 1474 to 1436 million years.

The formation was originally assigned to the Hess Canyon Group, in which it overlies the White Ledges Formation and is in turn overlain by the Blackjack Formation. The formation is divided into three informal members. The lower member is 60 to 200 meters (200 to 600 ft) of brown to maroon mudstone, with some arkose and graywacke at the base of the member. The middle member is 200 to 300 meters (500 to 1,000 ft) of tan to white mudstone with some silty shale. The upper member is 100 to 500 meters (350 to 1,500 ft) of brown slate that grades upwards into quartz-rich arkose. The formation erodes to a slope and is visibly folded.

The formation is interpreted as a nearshore fluvial and tidal deposit. It has been heavily deformed by thrusting that produced ~50% shortening. The formation was deposited in a large basin, the Yankee Joe — Defiance basin, which is contemporaneous with the Picuris basin. Detrital zircon age spectrums and isotope ratios from the formation support a reconstruction of the supercontinent, Rodinia, in which Australia was a source of sediments for southwestern Laurentia.

== History of investigation ==
The formation was first named by D.E. Livingston in 1969 for outcroppings 30 kilometers (20 mi) north of Globe, Arizona. Michael F. Doe and coinvestigators proposed removing the Yankee Joe and Blackjack into the Yankee Joe Group.
