= Medora Louise Krieger =

American Geologist

Medora Louise Krieger (1904–1994) was an American geologist known for becoming the first female field geologist in the United States Geological Survey (USGS). During her work with the USGS, Krieger was assigned to create geological maps of the area around Prescott Arizona in 1947, where she remained until her death in 1994. Krieger is noted as being one of the pioneering figures in the history of geology in the United States and was posthumously inducted into the American Mining Hall of Fame in 2018 by the Mining Foundation of the Southwest.

== Biography ==
=== Personal life and education ===
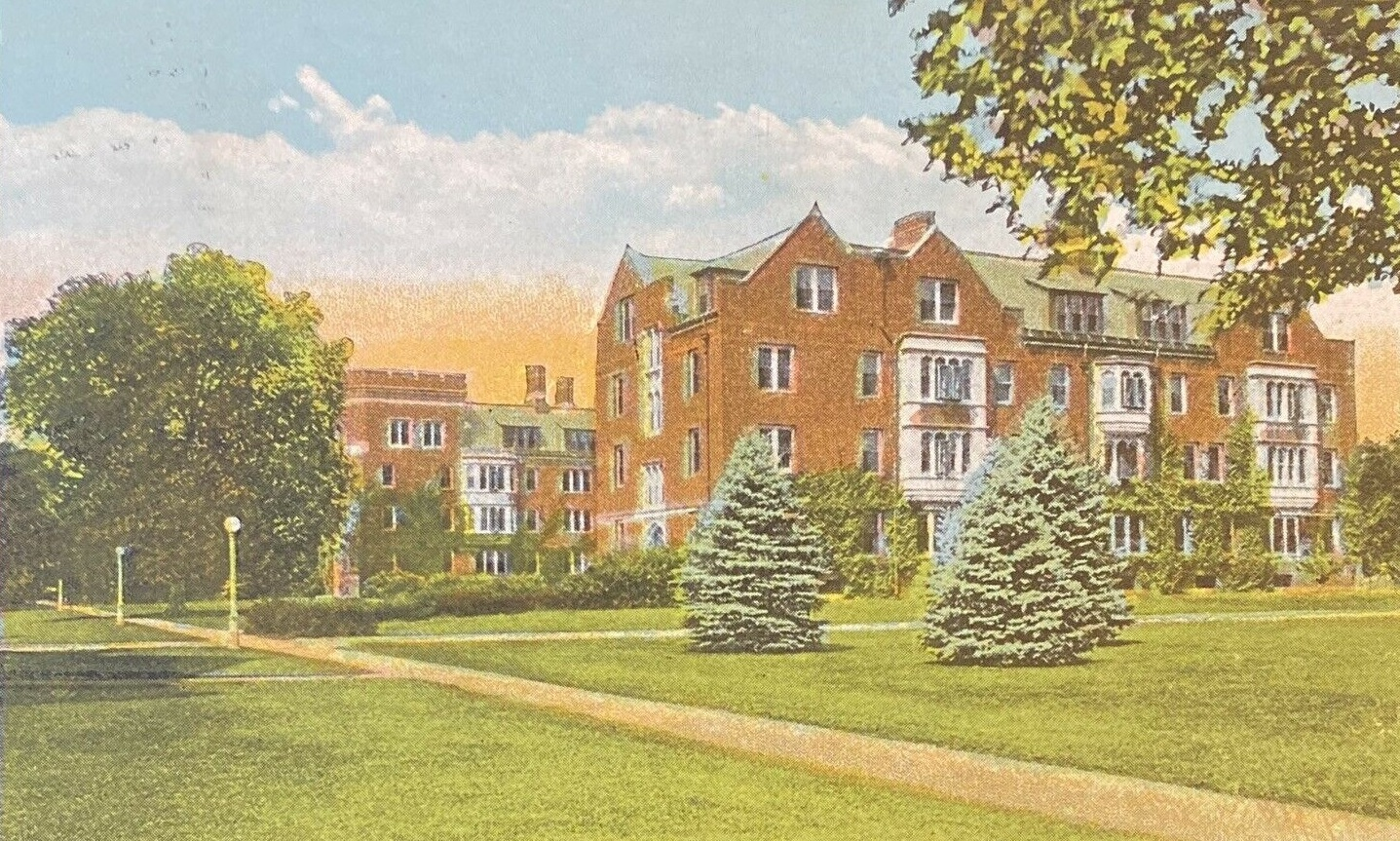
Vassar College, where Medora Louise Krieger earned her Bachelor's Degree in Geology in 1928.

Medora Louise Krieger (née Hooper) was born in Ticonderoga, New York in 1905. She displayed an early interest in geology, as her father, grandfather and two uncles were mining engineers. She attended Vassar College from 1924 to 1928, earning a bachelor's degree in geology. From there, she went on to Columbia University in pursuit of her masters and PhD. While attending Columbia, she met her husband Philip, who was an assistant professor at the institution, also in the field of geology. Louise and Philip were married in 1931. After her graduation from Columbia University, Krieger worked for the New York Geological Survey until the sudden death of her husband in 1940. During that time, their daughter, Katherine, was born. From 1942-1944 she taught at, Mount Holyoke College in Massachusetts. She then gained employment with the USGS beginning in the summer of 1944. Medora Louise Krieger died in 1994, in Prescott, Arizona aged 89.

Time at the United States Geological Survey (USGS)

The Modern United States geological survey Logo

Her time at the USGS began in 1944, when she was placed at a desk job in Washington, DC. In 1947, she was moved to the Southwestern Geology Branch in Prescott, Arizona, where she continued with some office work, but was eventually moved to field work. This was particularly notable as women were not allowed to work as field geologists within the institution at the time. Kriegers employment as a field geologist in 1947 altered this policy. Krieger, faced discrimination for her gender in the field of Geology, for example, when working on her first assignment mapping the Bagdad mine in Arizona, she was prevented from entering the proximity of the mine, due to the objection of the miners. She went on to create twelve significant topographic maps of Arizona. Other women at the USGS, wanted to participate in field work, but, were not allowed to so, Krieger invited other women to be considered as assistants in the field.

== Scientific contributions ==
During her 35 years stationed in Prescott, Krieger was able to create geological maps for much of the State of Arizona. Beyond her maps, Krieger also found the time to formulate and test new geological theories. Most notably, in "Large Landslides, composed of megabreccia, interbedded in Micene basin deposits, southeastern Arizona", Krieger theorizes that thin layers of compressed air can help to explain the lack of friction notable in some landslides. Medora Louise Krieger was considered a "Pioneering geologist" and posthumously inducted into the American Mining Hall of Fame by the Mining Foundation of the Southwest in 2018.

== Published works ==
Geology of the Prescott and Paulden Quadrangles, Arizona

Krieger's 1965 study gives a detailed look at the geology of the Prescott and Paulden Quadrangles, offering insight into the region's stratigraphy, tectonics, and mineral resources. Focusing on the precambrian, paleozoic and cenozoic rocks present in the Alder Group Formation, the comprehensive mapping and analysis contributed significantly to an understanding of central Arizona's geological history and its economic potential.

Large Landslides, composed of megabreccia, interbedded in Micene basin deposits, southeastern Arizona

This 1977 paper addresses the topic of landslides present in the Kearny and El Capitan mountain regions. Krieger included detailed measurements on multiple factors such as composition, depth, length, and analysis on the underlying playa and alluvial deposits. Krieger concludes by theorizing that compressed air may play a larger role in landslides than previously thought.

Ash-flow tuffs of the Galiuro Volcanics in the Northern Galiuro Mountains, Pinal County, Arizona

This 1979 paper studies the two distinctive major ash-flow tuff sheets of the upper Oligocene and lower Miocene Galiuro Volcanics in the northern part of the Galiuro Mountains, the Holy Joe and Aravaipa Members. Krieger found the Galiuro Volcanics to be so well exposed—and so clearly show characteristic features of ash-flow tuffs—that they could be a valuable teaching aid and a source of theses for geology students in the future.

== See also ==
- Geology of Arizona
- USGS
- Geological map
