= Mazatzal orogeny =

Mountain-building event in North America

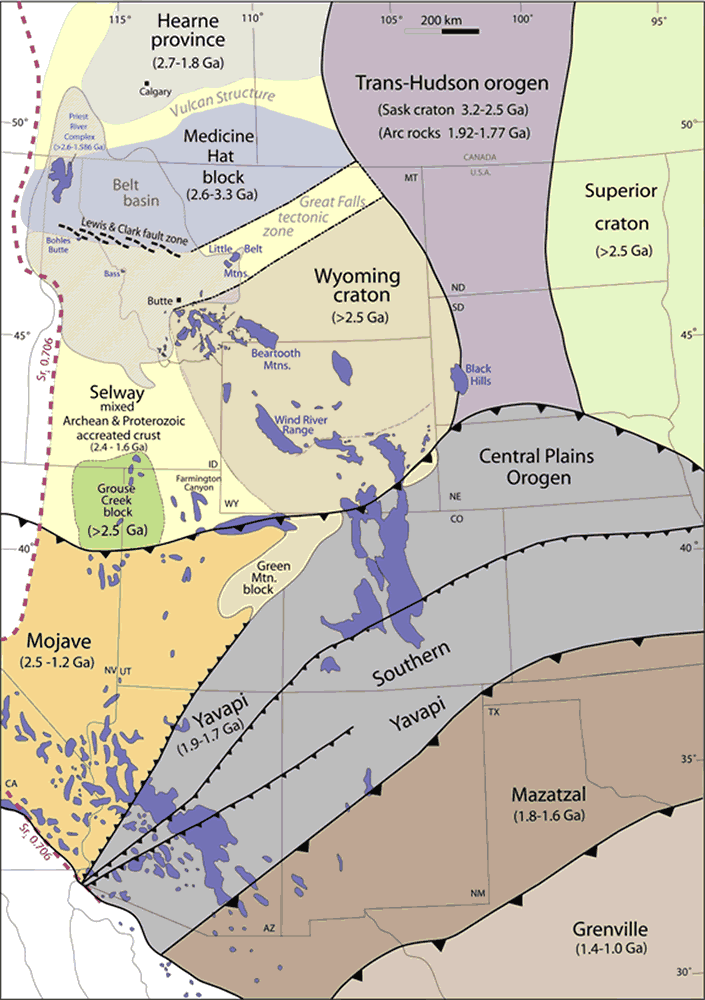
Precambrian provinces of western North America, showing the Mazatzal Province (in brown)

The Mazatzal orogeny was an orogenic event in what is now the Southwestern United States from 1650 to 1600 Mya in the Statherian Period of the Paleoproterozoic. Preserved in the rocks of New Mexico and Arizona, it is interpreted as the collision of the 1700-1600 Mya age Mazatzal island arc terrane with the proto-North American continent. This was the second in a series of orogenies within a long-lived convergent boundary along southern Laurentia that ended with the ca. 1200–1000 Mya Grenville orogeny during the final assembly of the supercontinent Rodinia, which ended an 800-million-year episode of convergent boundary tectonism.

== Description ==
Age and isotope data show that southern North America is composed of a series of northeast-trending provinces representing island arc terranes accreted onto the 1800 Mya core of Laurentia. These are the Yavapai province (1800–1700 Mya), the Mazatzal province (1700–1650 Mya), the Granite-Rhyolite province (1500–1300 Mya), and the Llano-Grenville province (1300–1000 Mya). Each is interpreted as juvenile crust of an island arc, together with smaller amounts of reworked older crust, that accreted to Laurentia in an orogenic pulse accompanied by pluton emplacement. The plutons sutured new and existing orogens together and helped convert the juvenile terranes to mature crust. The orogen pulses are identified as the Yavapai orogeny at 1710–1680 Mya, the Mazatzal orogeny at 1650–1600 Mya, the Picuris orogeny at 1450–1300 Mya, and the Grenville orogeny at 1300–950 Mya.

Some of the orogens were accompanied by slab rollback. This created short-lived extensional basins at 1700 and 1650 Mya that accumulated sand and high-silica volcanic debris to form Paleoproterozoic quartzite-rhyolite successions. Subsequent convergent tectonics closed the basins and thrust imbricated the successions.

The northeast-trending provinces are truncated by Neoproterozoic passive margins that indicate the orogenic system once extended much further. This part of the basis for the AUSWUS reconstruction of Rodinia, which places Australia adjacent to the southwestern US from 1800 to 1000 Mya. Other supporting evidence includes correspondence of 1450 and 1000 Ga paleomagnetic poles between Australia and Laurentia. The northeastern extension of the orogenic belt would then correspond to the Gothian orogeny in Baltica and the southwestern extension to the Albany-Fraser orogeny. The close correspondence of detrital zircon ages and Hf isotope isotopes between the Mazazatl province and Australia supports this reconstruction. However, the placement of Australia has been disputed on the basis of paleomagnetic data. The SWEAT reconstruction places East Antarctica on the southwest extension of the Yavapai Province.

The Mazatzal Province was originally described as the "Mazatzal Revolution" by Wilson in 1939, who had mapped the northern and southern Mazatzal Mountains. The term 'Mazatzal orogeny' was applied to describe the Mazatzal Revolution by Lee Silver in 1965. The province extends from Arizona to Colorado south of a somewhat poorly defined boundary with the Yavapai Province that runs roughly along the Jemez Lineament. From there it continues along the southern margin of the Canadian Shield northeastward to Newfoundland. The southern boundary runs from northern Sonora to Newfoundland roughly parallel to the northern boundary. Individual island arc terranes accreted to Laurentia during the Yavapai Orogeny include the Pinal and lower Manzano Group. The Labradorian orogeny is interpreted as a regional manifestation of the overall Mazatzal orogeny.

Deformation from the Mazatzal Orogeny extended into a foreland zone of the Yavapai province. Plutons emplaced by the orogeny may extend as far north as the Cheyenne belt and as far northwest as the Mojave province.

== Relationship to Picuris Orogeny ==
A number of quartzite-rhyolite successions previously associated with the Mazatal orogeny have been shown to contain both Paleoproterozoic and Mesoproterozoic formations, based on detrital zircon geochronology. The younger formations define the Picuris orogeny at 1450–1300 Mya. This has raised the question of whether the Mazatzal origeny was actually distinct from the Picuris orogeny.

Silver estimated the timing of the Mazatzal orogeny as between 1715 Mya and 1650 Mya. The end of the event was based on the U-Pb age of a post-tectonic granite located near Young, Arizona and folded rocks of the Alder Group (now recognized as a pre-1700 Ma succession of rock.) In contrast, Livingston's work in the Upper Salt River Canyon utilized Rb-Sr dating techniques to estimated the timing of the Mazatzal orogeny between 1425 and 1380 +/-100 Mya.

Further mapping in the 1970s and 1980s showed that the Mazatzal Group rested entirely an angular unconformity with sheeted dikes of the 1729 Mya Payson ophiolite and pre-1700 Mya Alder Group. Workers were unable to identify any ash layers directly within the Mazatzal Group needed to constrain the actual timing of folding and thrusting attributed to the Mazatzal orogeny. It was ultimately recognized that the granite near Young, Arizona, dated by Silver in 1965 was the best post-tectonic timing relationship between the pre-1700 Ma, deformed Alder Group and granite near Young. Redating of the granite in the late 1980s confirmed its age and the timing relationship between the folded Alder Group and granite. (The best age estimate is now 1664+/-17 Mya.) However, this assumed that the deformation of the pre-1700 Ma Alder Group also included the northwest-directed folding and thrusting in the Mazatzal Group. This discounted the significance of the obvious angular unconformity at the base of the Mazatzal Group.

New mapping and utilization of detrital zircon geochronology during the 2010s were able to constrain the age of the youngest sediments above the Mazatzal Group involved in the classic deformation of the Mazatzal orogeny. Detrital zircons from the Hopi Springs Shale in the northern Mazatzal Mountains yielded a maximum depositional age (MDA) of 1571 Mya. Similar sediments collected from a shale folded in the core of the Four Peaks synform yielded a MDA of 1580 Mya. In the Upper Salt River Canyon, overlying the White Ledges Formation (a correlative to the Mazatzal Group), sediments from the conformably overlying Yankee Joe and Blackjack Formations yielded MDA of ca. 1470 Mya. The entire sediment sequence of Redmond (1657 Mya), White Ledges, Yankee Joe, and Blackjack Formations were deformed sometime after 1470 Mya. The event buried the section to 6–10 km deep before it was intruded by the 1450 Ma Ruin Granite.

These timings are contemporaneous with the timing of deformation of the Picuris orogeny defined in north-central New Mexico. However, there are indications of three distinct orogenic episodes at the Black Canyon of the Gunnison, with an exhumation surface separating Yavapai and Mazatzal events. The Sandia, Manzano, and Los Pinos Mountains of central New Mexico contain 1.65-1.66 Ga plutons which are interpreted as a magmatic arc system in which plutons were intruding their own volcanic edifices and were also intruding developing syn-contractional, arc-related sedimentary basins. These are distinct from the plutons emplaced syntectonically 1453 to 1456 Mya during the Picuris orogeny. The orogenies may be distinct but with the Picuris orogeny badly overprinting the earlier Mazatzal orogeny.

== See also ==
- List of orogenies
- Geology of Arizona
- Geology of New Mexico
