= Alder Group =

Group of geologic formations in Arizona, US

- Stratigraphic range: 1720–1700 Ma
- Type: Group
- Unit of: Tonto Basin Supergroup
- Sub-units: Board Canyon Formation; Houdon Formation; Flying W Formation; Breadpan Formation
- Underlies: Red Rock Group
- Overlies: East Verde River Formation
- Thickness: 3,000 meters (9,800 ft)

Lithology
- Primary: metasedimentary rock, metavolcanic rock

Location
- Coordinates: 33.60°N 111.32°W
- Region: Arizona
- Country: United States

Type section
- Named for: Alder Creek, Arizona
- Named by: E.D. Wilson
- Year defined: 1939
- Alder Group (the United States) Alder Group (Arizona)

The Alder Group is a group of geologic formations exposed in the Mazatzal Mountains of central Arizona, US. It dates to the Statherian Period of the Paleoproterozoic and records mountain-building events associated with the assembly of North America.

== Description ==
The formation consists of about 3,000 feet (910 m) of metavolcanic and metasedimentary rock exposed in the Mazatzal Mountains. The formation is underlain by the East Verde River Formation and overlain by the Red Rock Group. Together with the younger Mazatzal Group, these groups form the Tonto Basin Supergroup. The formation is mostly volcanic and volcaniclastic sedimentary rock, but with some sedimentary beds formed by weathering of continental rock (terrigenous beds). All have experienced metamorphism. The Alder Group is interpreted as basin fill of an intra-arc basin that formed along what was then the southern coast of Laurentia, the ancient core of North America.

=== Formations ===
The formation is divided (in ascending stratigraphic order) into the Breadpan, Flying W, Houdon, and Board Cabin Formations. The Breadpan and Houdon Formations are primarily metasedimentary rock, while the Flying W and Board Cabin Formations are primarily metavolcanic rock.

== History of investigation ==
The unit was first designated as the Alder sedimentary series by D.H. Wilson in 1939, for exposures near Alder Creek in the Mazatzal Mountains. Wilson originally assigned the unit to the Yavapai Group and believed the beds had been metamorphosed in a single "Mazatzal Revolution". In 1958, C.A. Anderson and S.C. Creasey mapped the unit into the Jerome, Arizona, area, raised it to group rank, and divided it into six formations. That same year, Gordon Castil redesignated the unit as a formation and divided the unit in its original area in the Mazatzal Mountains into three unnamed members.

In 1971, Anderson and coinvestigators refined the definition of the group, restricting it to the Mazatzal Mountains and reassigning the beds in the Jerome area to the Big Bug Group.

In 1993, Karl Karlstrom and S.A. Bowring divided the Alder Group into the Breadpan, Flying W, Houdon, and Board Cabin Formations.
