= Blackjack Formation =

Geologic formation in Arizona, US

- Stratigraphic range: Calymmian
- Type: Formation
- Underlies: Apache Group
- Overlies: Yankee Joe Formation
- Thickness: 600 m (2,000 ft)

Lithology
- Primary: Argillaceous quartzite

Location
- Coordinates: 33.70°N 110.71°W
- Region: Arizona
- Country: United States

Type section
- Named for: Blackjack Mountains, Arizona
- Named by: D.E. Livingston
- Year defined: 1969
- Blackjack Formation (the United States) Blackjack Formation (Arizona)

The Blackjack Formation is a geological formation exposed in the Blackjack Mountains, Arizona, US. The age of the formation is between 1474 and 1436 million years, and detrital zircon geochronology of its sediments provides clues for reconstruction the supercontinent, Rodinia.

== Description ==
The Blackjack Joe Formation consists of 600 meters (2,000 ft) of argillaceous (clay-rich) sediments. Detrital zircon geochronology establishes a minimum age for the formation of 1474 ± 13 million years. The formation is intruded by the Ruin Granite, with a radiometric age of 1436 ± 2 million years, thus constraining the age of the Blackjack Formation to 1474 to 1436 million years.

The formation was originally assigned to the Hess Canyon Group, in which it overlies the Yankee Joe Formation. It is overlain in turn across an unconformity by the Apache Group.

The formation is interpreted as a nearshore fluvial and tidal deposit. The formation was deposited in a large basin, the Yankee Joe — Defiance basin, which is contemporaneous with the Picuris basin. Detrital zircon age spectrums and isotope ratios from the formation support a reconstruction of the supercontinent, Rodinia, in which Australia was a source of sediments for southwestern Laurentia.

== History of investigation ==
The formation was first named by D.E. Livingston in 1969 for outcroppings 30 kilometers (20 mi) in the Blackjack Mountains, Arizona. Michael F. Doe and coinvestigators proposed removing the Yankee Joe and Blackjack into the Yankee Joe Group.
