= Mount Union (Arizona) =

Landform in Yavapai County, Arizona

- Location within Arizona Location within the United States

Highest point
- Elevation: 7,988 ft (2,435 m) NAVD 88
- Prominence: 2,939 ft (896 m)
- Isolation: 54.4 mi (87.5 km)
- Listing: Arizona County high point
- Coordinates: 34°24′54″N 112°24′16″W

Geography
- Location: Yavapai County, Arizona, U.S.
- Parent range: Bradshaw Mountains
- Topo map: USGS Groom Creek

Mount Union is a mountain located in the Prescott National Forest in central Yavapai County, Arizona. The mountain's summit is the highest point of the Bradshaw Mountains, and of Yavapai County. Mount Union is flanked to the northeast by Mount Davis. A lookout tower built by the CCC is on top of Mount Union, and exceeds 8,000 foot elevation. A service road for the communication towers allows easy access to the summit of Mount Union. However, the road goes through private property and is closed to motorized vehicles. Walk to the top for great 360 degree views.

== See also ==
- List of mountains in Arizona
