= Payson ophiolite =

- Stratigraphic range: Statherian
- Underlies: Tonto Basin Supergroup
- Overlies: Larson Spring Formation

Lithology
- Primary: basalt, gabbro

Location
- Coordinates: 34.18°N 111.34°W
- Region: Arizona; Arizona
- Country: United States

Type section
- Named for: Payson, Arizona
- Named by: J.C. Dann
- Year defined: 1991
- Payson ophiolite (the United States) Payson ophiolite (Arizona)

The Payson ophiolite is an ophiolite of Statherian age (late Paleoproterozoic) located near Payson, Arizona, US.

== Description ==
The Payson ophiolite crops out south and west of the town of Payson, Arizona, in the Arizona transition zone between the Colorado Plateau and the Basin and Range. It consists of a well-developed sheeted dyke complex that grades below into gabbroic rock and above into submarine volcanic rock. The whole sequence dips gently (by about 15 degrees) to the southwest. The ophiolite is exposed over a sizable area and is little deformed, with metamorphism limited to the lower greenschist facies. Much of the gabbro is essentially unaltered.

The ophiolite is intruded by a sill of granitic rock, the Payson Granite, which conceals the deepest layers of the ophiolite, including the entire ultramafic mantle portion of the ophiolite. The deepest accessible layers are the gabbronorite of Round Valley. Regionally, the ophiolite is thought to be overlain by the Tonto Basin Supergroup.

=== Origin and Tectonics ===
The ophiolite is part of the Mazatzal block, a terrane 50 to 60 kilometers (31 to 37 mi) wide on the eastern end of the Arizona transition zone. The Payson ophiolite lies on a basement of granitic rock overlain by felsic volcanic and volcaniclastic rock of the Larson Spring Formation. This shows that the ophiolite was emplaced by rifting of an existing island arc, which likely produced a pull-apart basin.
