= Four Peaks =

Landform near Phoenix, Arizona

Browns Peak
- Yavapai: Wi:khoba
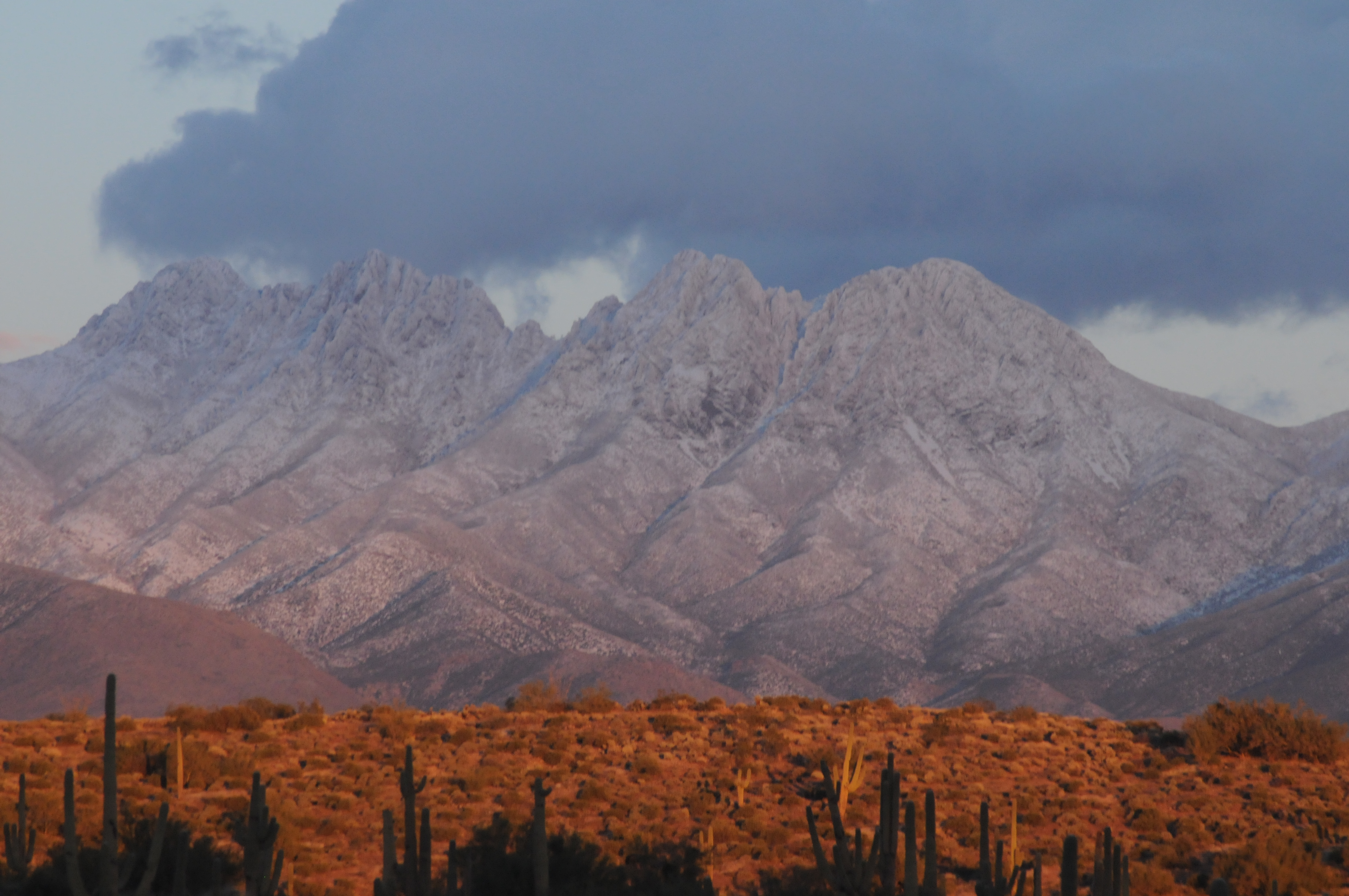
- View of Four Peaks with some snow

Highest point
- Elevation: 7,659 ft (2,334 m) NAVD 88
- Prominence: 3,297 ft (1,005 m)
- Listing: Arizona county high point
- Coordinates: 33°41′04″N 111°19′32″W

Geography
- Location within Arizona
- Location: Gila / Maricopa counties, Arizona, U.S.
- Parent range: Mazatzal Mountains
- Topo map: USGS Four Peaks

Climbing
- Easiest route: Exposed scramble, class 3

Four Peaks (Yavapai: Wi:khoba) is a prominent landmark on the eastern skyline of Phoenix. Part of the Mazatzal Mountains, it is located in the Four Peaks Wilderness in the Tonto National Forest, 40 miles (64 km) east-northeast of Phoenix. In winter, Four Peaks offers much of the Phoenix metro area a view of snow-covered peaks. Four Peaks is the site of an amethyst mine that produces top-grade amethyst.

The name Four Peaks is a reference to the four distinct peaks of a north–south ridge forming the massif's summit. The northernmost peak is named Brown's Peak and is the tallest of the four at 7,659 feet (2,334 m). It is the highest point in Maricopa County. The remaining summits are Brother, Sister, and Amethyst from north to south are 7,644 feet (2,330 m), 7,574 feet (2,309 m) and 7,526 feet (2,294 m) in elevation.

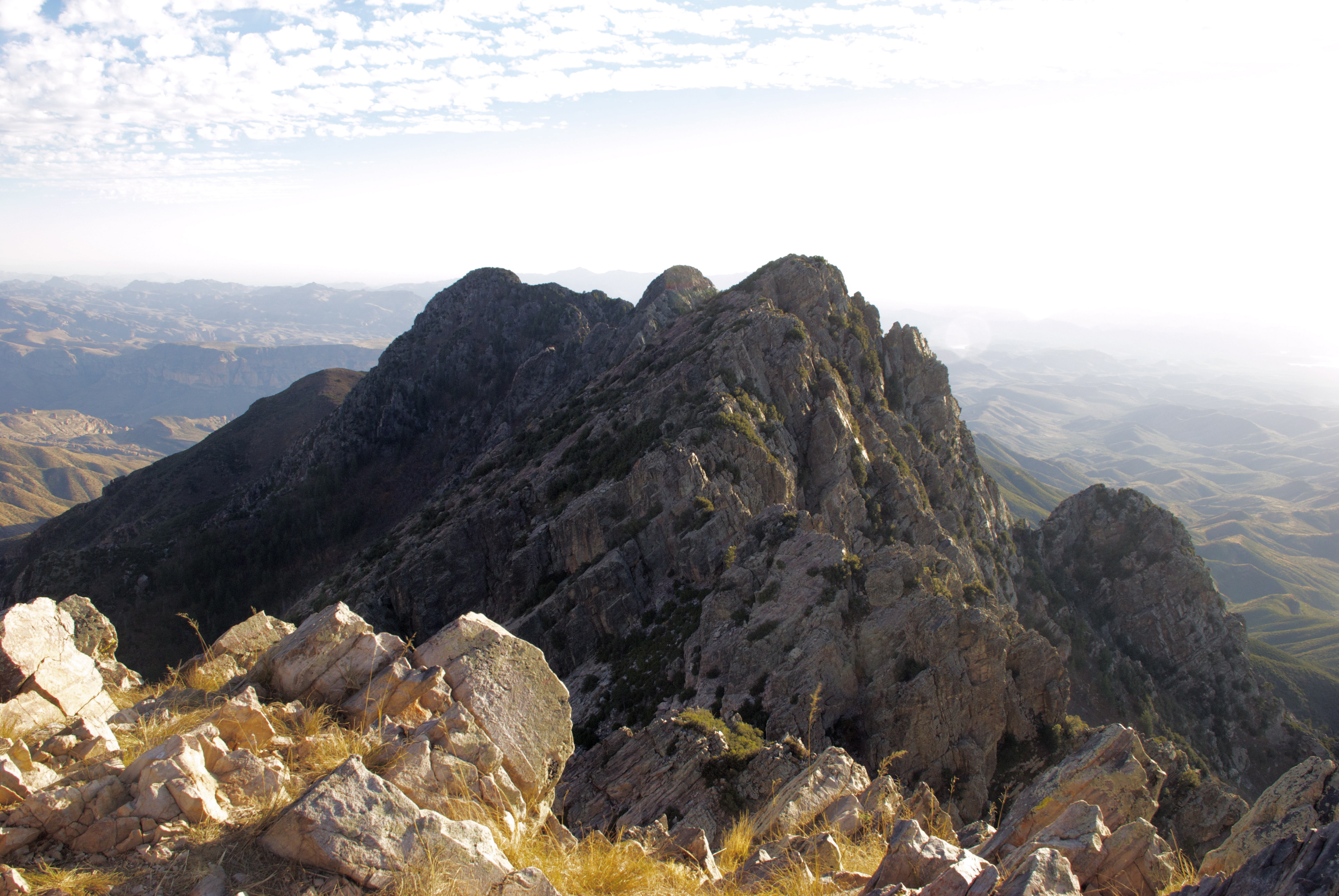
View of other three peaks from Browns Peak

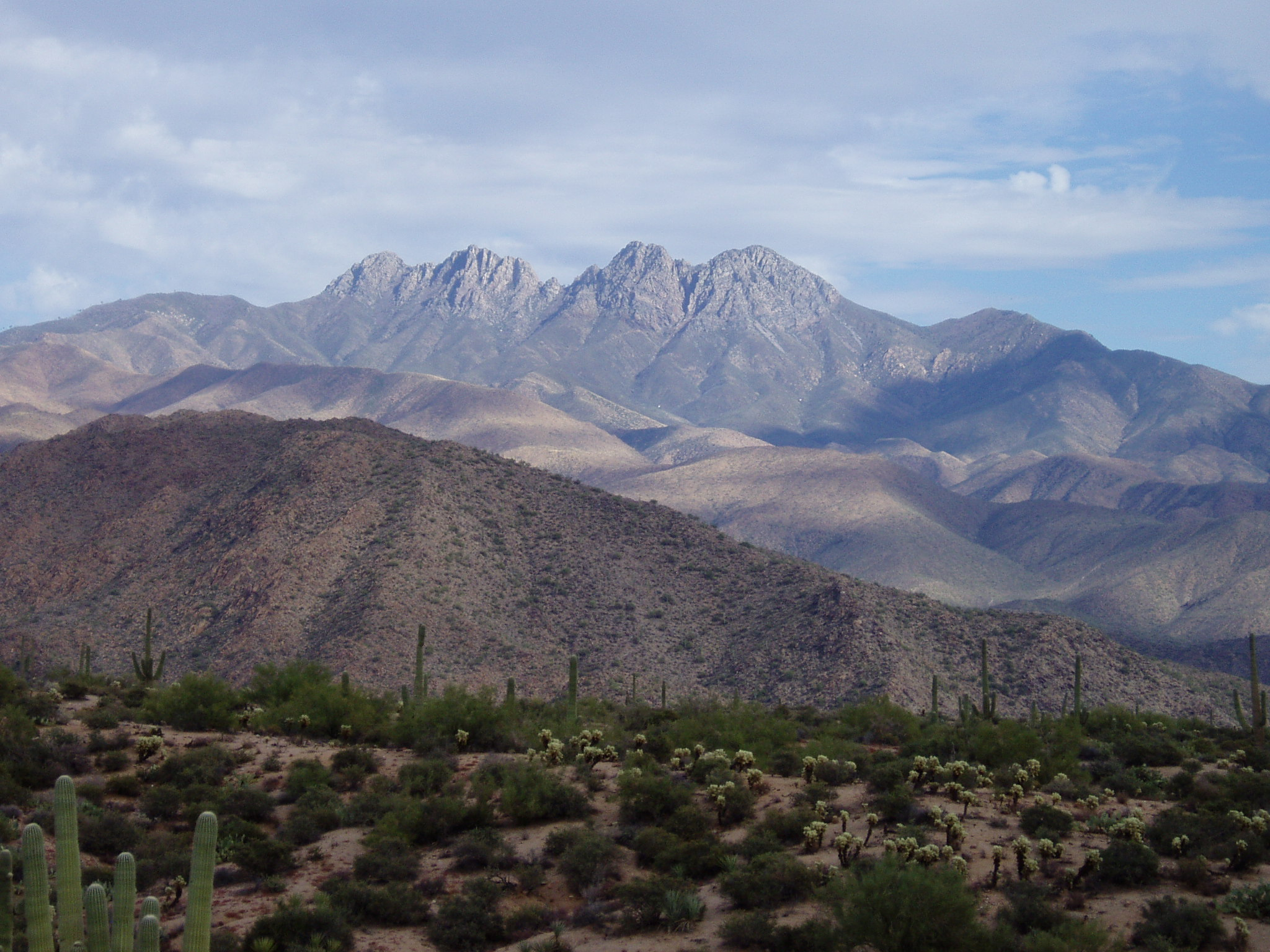
View from desert floor of Four Peaks

Four Peaks is depicted on the standard Vehicle registration plates of Arizona.

== Four Peaks Wilderness ==
The Four Peaks Wilderness, established in 1984, covers 60,740 acres of land. It is home to a diverse variety of plants and animals due to the quick change of elevation in the range. Brown's Trail, found in the Four Peaks Wilderness, is used to reach the tallest peak and is home to black bears, ring-tailed cats, skunks, and coyotes. The Four Peaks Wilderness contains a section of the Arizona Trail, which is considered one of the most difficult passages, as it is infrequently maintained. On April 27, 1996, a party of two campers left a campfire unattended near Lone Pine Saddle. This caused the Lone Fire which burned over 61,000 acres and lasted 11 days. The Lone fire was Arizona's largest recorded wildfire prior to the Rodeo–Chediski Fire in 2002.

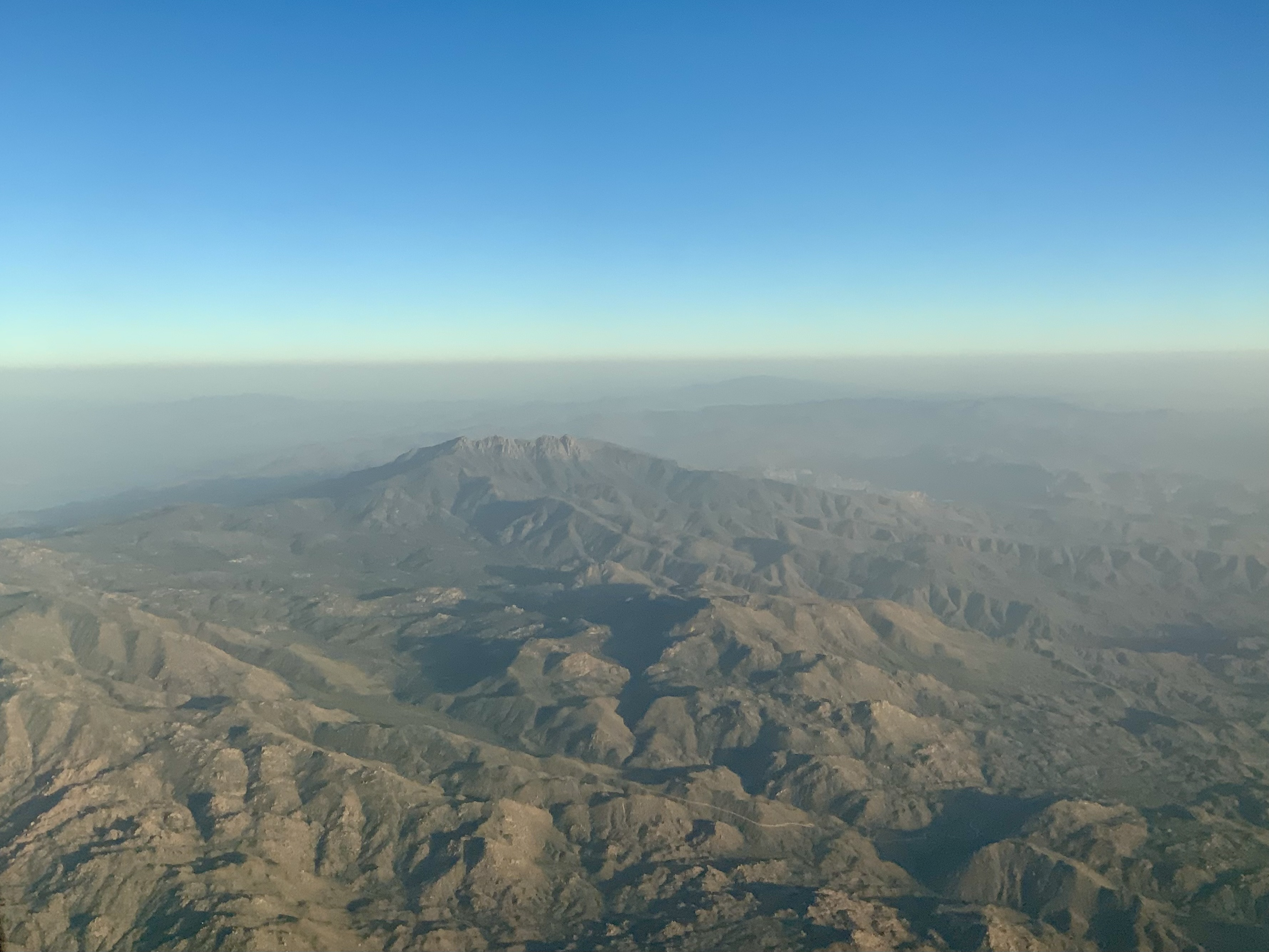
Four Peaks, aerial view
