= List of highest points in Arizona by county =

This is a list of highest points in the U.S. state of Arizona, in alphabetical order by county. Elevations are from USGS 1:24,000 scale topographic quadrangle maps. Elevations followed by a plus sign (+) are minimal values. The contour interval is shown after the (+).

Robert Walko listed the Arizona county high points and then hiked them in 1977. At that time there were only 14 counties in the state, as La Paz county was not split from Yuma county until 1983.

County	Name	Height feet / m	Map
Apache	Mount Baldy	11,400+40 / 3,475+12	Mount Baldy 1997
Cochise	Chiricahua Peak	9,759 / 2,975	Chiricahua Peak 1997
Coconino	Humphreys Peak	12,633 / 3,851	Humphreys Peak 1983
Gila	county line near Promontory Butte	7,920+40 / 2,414+12	Promontory Butte 1998
Gila	county line near Myrtle Point	7,920+40 / 2,414+12	Dane Canyon 2004
Graham	Mount Graham	10,720 / 3,267	Mount Graham 1996
Greenlee	spot elevation 9,441	9,441 / 2,878	Strayhorse 1997
La Paz	Harquahala Mountain	5,681 / 1,732	Harquahala Mountain 1990
Maricopa	Browns Peak	7,657 / 2,334	Four Peaks 2004
Mohave	Hualapai Peak	8,417 / 2,566	Hualapai Peak 1978
Navajo	Black Mesa	8,168 / 2,490	Kayenta West 1968
Pima	Mount Lemmon	9,157 / 2,791	Mount Lemmon 1996
Pinal	700 feet north of Rice Peak	7,280+(40) / 2,219+12	Campo Bonito 1996
Santa Cruz	Mount Wrightson	9,453 / 2,881	Mount Wrightson 1996
Yavapai	Mount Union	7,979 / 2,432	Groom Creek 1974
Yuma	Signal Peak	4,877 / 1,487	Palm Canyon 1990

== Bibliography and further reading ==
- Surgent, Scott (2010). The County High Points of Arizona. Tempe, Az.: Xaler Press.
