= Geology of Arizona =

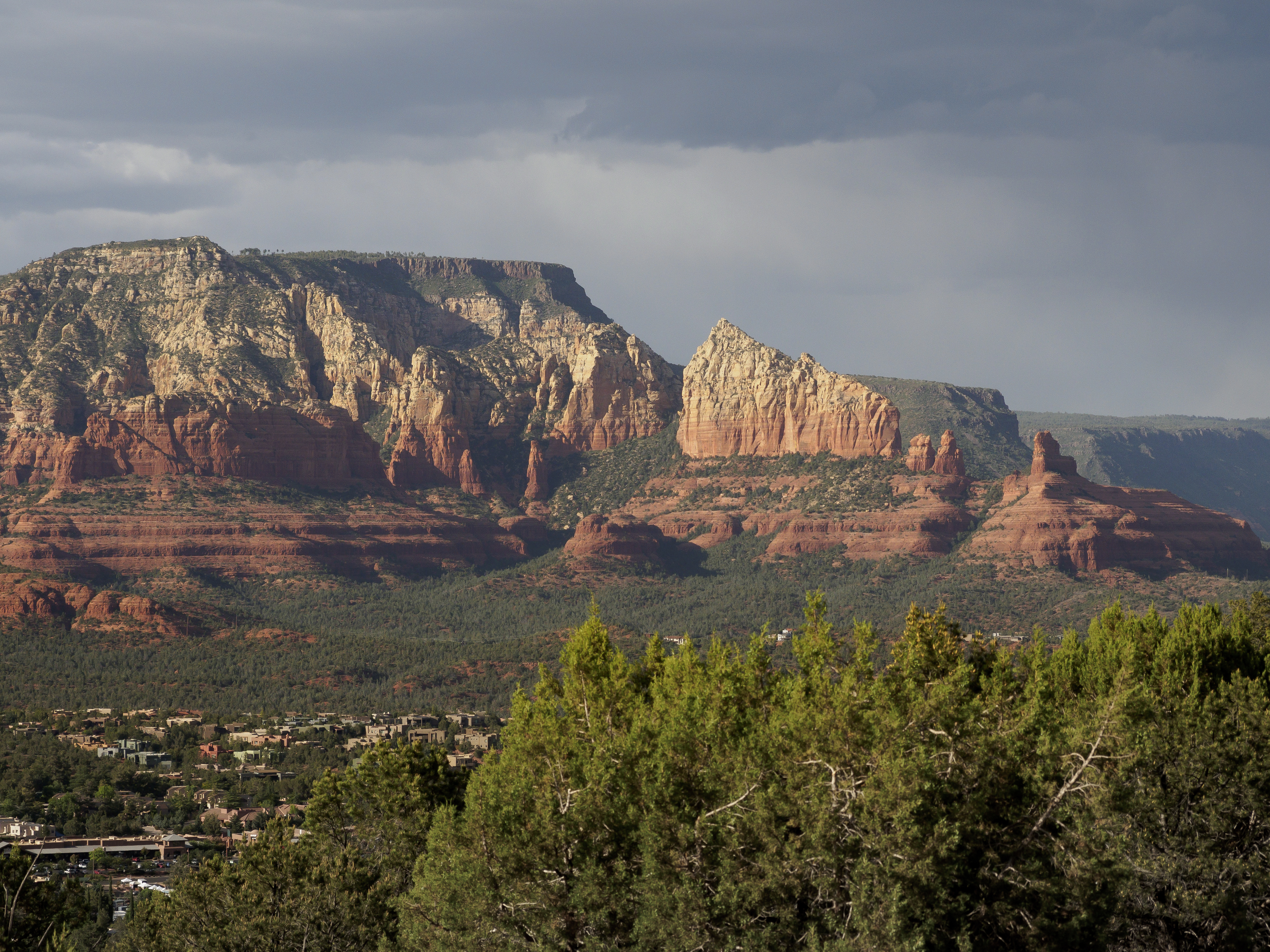
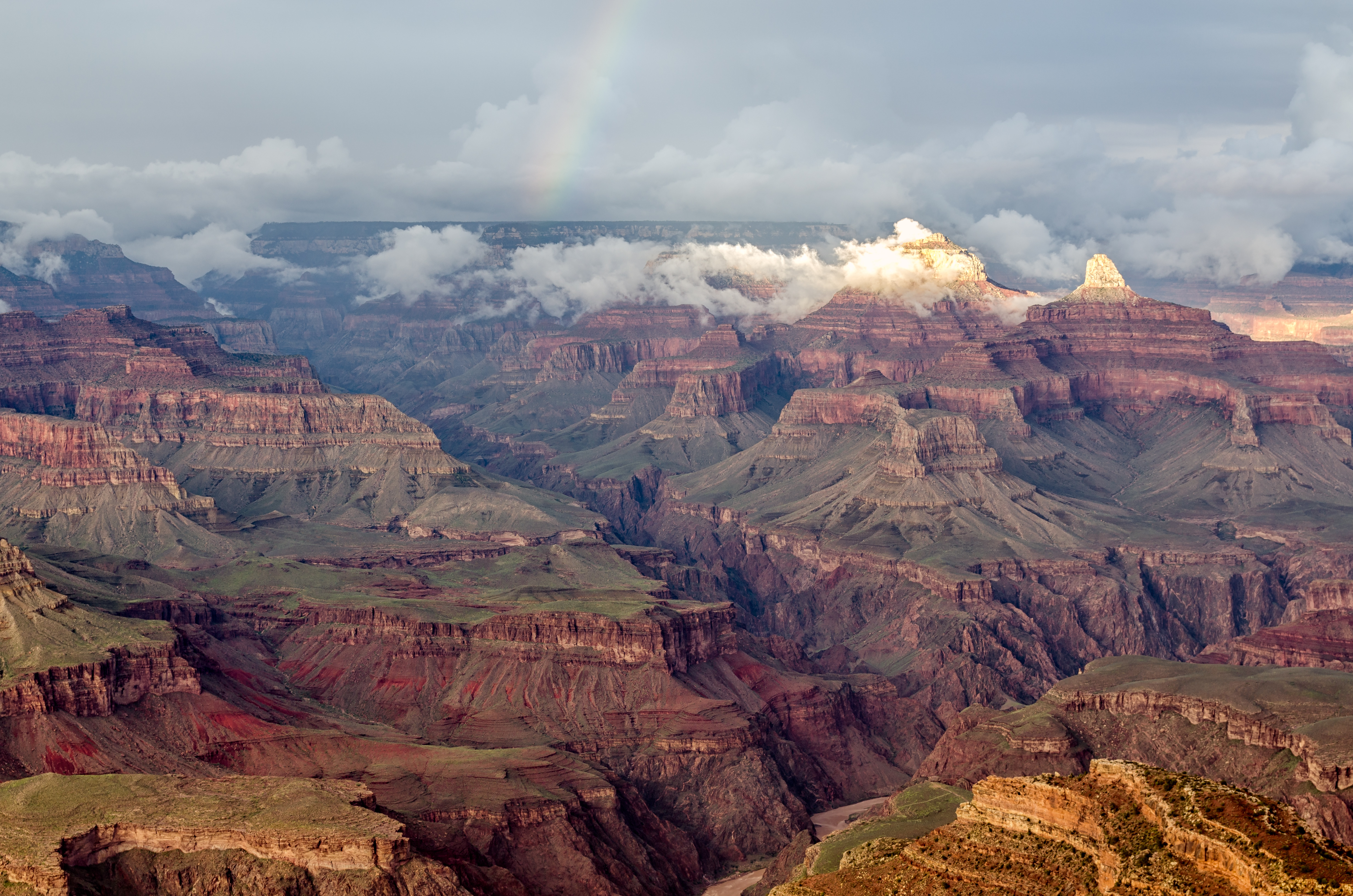
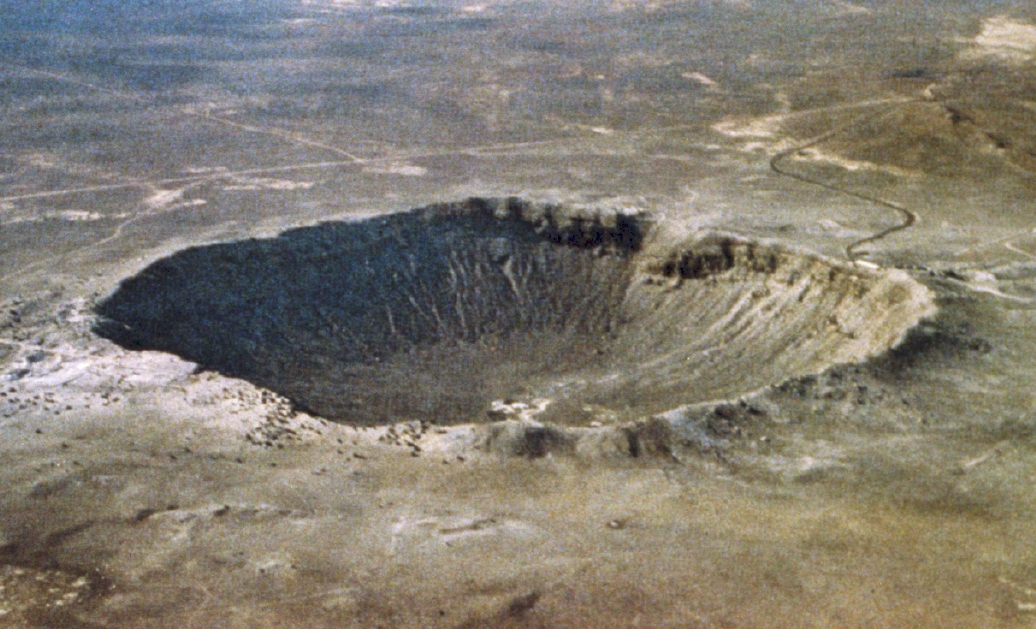
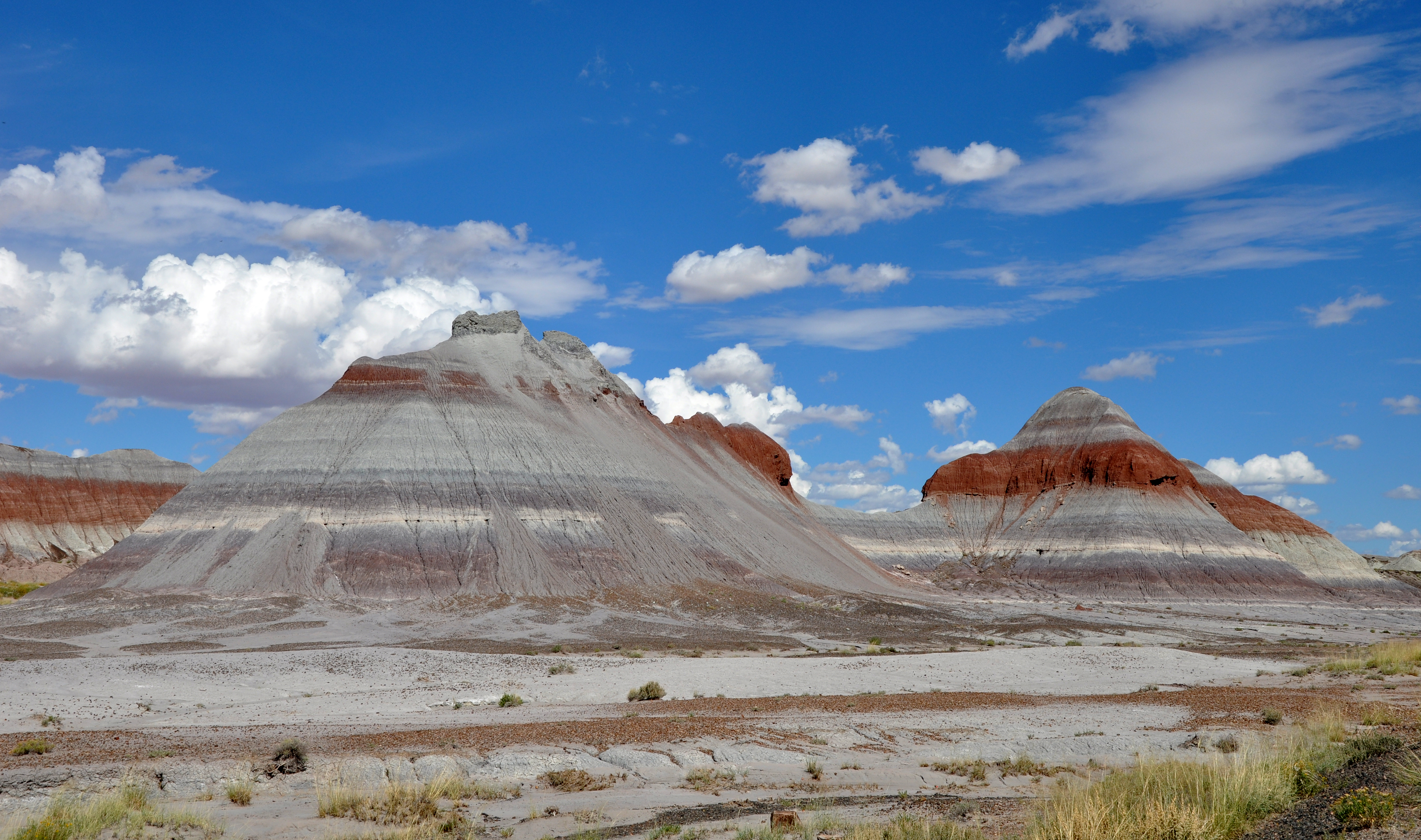
Clockwise from upper left: Sedona, Grand Canyon National Park, Barringer Crater, Petrified Forest National Park

The geology of Arizona began to form in the Precambrian. Igneous and metamorphic crystalline basement rock may have been much older, but was overwritten during the Yavapai and Mazatzal orogenies in the Proterozoic. The Grenville orogeny to the east caused Arizona to fill with sediments, shedding into a shallow sea. Limestone formed in the sea was metamorphosed by mafic intrusions. The Great Unconformity is a famous gap in the stratigraphic record, as Arizona experienced 900 million years of terrestrial conditions, except in isolated basins. The region oscillated between terrestrial and shallow ocean conditions during the Paleozoic as multi-cellular life became common and three major orogenies to the east shed sediments before North America became part of the supercontinent Pangaea. The breakup of Pangaea was accompanied by the subduction of the Farallon Plate, which drove volcanism during the Nevadan orogeny and the Sevier orogeny in the Mesozoic, which covered much of Arizona in volcanic debris and sediments. The Mid-Tertiary ignimbrite flare-up created smaller mountain ranges with extensive ash and lava in the Cenozoic, followed by the sinking of the Farallon slab in the mantle throughout the past 14 million years, which has created the Basin and Range Province. Arizona has extensive mineralization in veins, due to hydrothermal fluids and is notable for copper-gold porphyry, lead, zinc, rare minerals formed from copper enrichment and evaporites among other resources.

== Stratigraphy, tectonics and geologic history ==
=== Precambrian: Before 539 million years ago ===
The oldest rocks in Arizona likely date to the late Archean or early Proterozoic, although evidence of earlier geology was overwritten during the Yavapai orogeny and the Mazatzal orogeny—major mountain building events 1.8 to 1.6 billion years ago. During this period in the Proterozoic, the Yavapai, Pinal and Vishnu schist rocks formed due to intense metamorphism and were intruded with granites. These ancient deformed rocks are found at the base of the Grand Canyon, in Salt River Canyon, and in mountain ranges throughout the state.

Arizona's oldest rocks overall are metamorphosed volcanic rocks, including basalt and rhyolite and related sedimentary rocks, that now constitute the bottom of the Grand Canyon and formed beginning 1.8 billion years ago. The Verde district at Jerome, in Yavapai County also preserves rocks from this period. There, ancient submarine hydrothermal vents precipitated sulfides directly onto an ancient seabed, creating massive copper and zinc ore sulfide deposits.

The Mazatzal orogeny occurred from 1.7 to 1.61 billion years ago. During this event, igneous rocks that were more enriched in quartz than previous rocks formed the Mazatzal Mountains and the New River area. The Pinal Schist also formed during this period and was intruded by granite and granodiorite. The oldest Proterozoic metamorphic and igneous rocks were intruded with granites and pegmatite between 1.45 and 1.4 billion years ago. The Oracle Granite, near Tucson, the Ruin Granite, close to the Ray-Superior area, and the Zoroaster Granite at the base of the Grand Canyon all contain one to two inch long, pink orthoclase crystals. The orogeny generated the Texas Zone, an area of fractures, fissures and faults in rock, trending northwest from Texas to California. In Arizona, these veins commonly host exotic minerals including beryllium and tantalum, and elements like lithium, bismuth, uranium and tungsten. These minerals were emplaced by hot hydrothermal fluids moving through the weak zones in the rock.

The major Grenville orogeny in the east of the Proto-North American continent impacted areas as far west as Arizona, producing large rift basins between 1.2 and 1 billion years ago. Rift basins were structurally related to the formation of copper deposits and the Keweenawan basalt flaws in Michigan, and regionally, the basins filled with thick layers of sediment in Arizona. The Apache Group near the bottom of the Grand Canyon, includes fluvial shale and sandstone, as well as limestone from a shallow sea, exposed in the Salt River Canyon. The limestone contains stromatolite remains, mounds of blue-green algae. The Apache Group was intruded with basalt and diabase between 1.05 and 1.14 billion years ago. The Mescal Limestone metamorphosed, forming asbestos and superheated diabase magma "baked" the limestone to marble. The 1.07 billion year old limestone, shale, quartzite, sandstone and basalt of the Unkar Group is also found in the Grand Canyon.

The Mesoproterozoic formations in the Grand Canyon are overlain by the 850 million year old, Neoproterozoic Chuar Group and Sixtymile Formation sedimentary rocks. The Great Unconformity is a famous gap in the stratigraphic record of the Grand Canyon of 900 million years between Proterozoic granitic rocks and Cambrian marine sediments. For the remaining 350 million years of the Proterozoic, Arizona experienced extensive erosion, with only a few areas of sediment deposition in down-dropped basins.

=== Paleozoic (539-251 million years ago) ===
Throughout the Paleozoic as multi-cellular life became common, Arizona formed the passive western margin of North America. Although the region was tectonically quiet and had no volcanic activity or igneous intrusions, it was impacted by a series of major orogenies to the east. The Taconic orogeny, between 490 and 445 million years ago, the Acadian orogeny, from 410 to 380 million years ago, and the Alleghanian orogeny from 325 to 220 million years ago pushed up towering mountain ranges. Extensive erosion of these mountains shed sediments westward into a shallow sea in Arizona. Limestone formed in the shallow sea contains many of the state's caves, important ore deposits and high-quality mineral specimens such as wulfenite. Invertebrate fossils are common in marine deposits from this period.

In the Middle Cambrian, 520 to 488 million years ago, the seashore moved eastward depositing beach-related sandstones. These, in turn, are overlain by sandstone, siltstone and shale deposited under near-shore conditions, which were covered over 515 to 488 million years ago by limestone, traced with worm boreholes, as well as thin beds of conglomerate. Trilobite and brachiopod fossils appear in the stratigraphic record.

Due to uplift during the Taconic orogeny, the sea retreated and Arizona returned to continental conditions during the Ordovician and Silurian leaving few rocks from these time periods. During the Devonian, Arizona alternated between marine and continental conditions, as a subduction zone and volcanic island arc appeared in the area of Nevada. The Martin Formation in southern Arizona contains limestone, sandstone, shale and chert deposited in the Late Devonian and laden with fish and invertebrate fossils. A lull between orogenies in the Mississippian period of the Carboniferous resulted in a major marine transgression and the formation of thick limestone. The Redwall Limestone in the Grand Canyon and the Esabrosa Limestone in southern Arizona, both date to this period and contain coral, brachiopod and crinoid fossils. Subsequent erosion has generated large caves in the limestone, including Kartchner Cavern in Cochise County and the Grand Canyon's Vesey's Paradise.

During the Pennsylvanian and the Permian, the final assembly of the Appalachian Mountains to the elevation of the Himalayas occurred with the Alleghanian orogeny and the formation of the supercontinent Pangaea. Glaciation of the southern hemisphere raised and lowered sea levels in Arizona, creating the ledge and slope topography common in the Grand Canyon, Sedona and Monument Valley, with alternating layers of siltstone, limestone, sandstone, dolomite and shale. The Kaibab Limestone is a famous formation from this time, covering much of northern Arizona.

=== Mesozoic (251-66 million years ago) ===
In the Mesozoic, the supercontinent Pangaea began to rift apart in its center to form the Atlantic Ocean. The subduction of the Farallon Plate beneath western North America remains a poorly understood event, although new seismic and computer tomography modeling is shedding light on the event. As the oceanic plate subsided under North America, it generated partial melting conditions that formed volcanoes on the surface in California and Arizona.

Volcanic activity commenced in western Arizona around 205 million years ago, kicking off the Nevadan orogeny, which lasted until 145 million years ago, spanning the Triassic into the Jurassic. Granite intrusions 190 million years ago enriched many veins with minerals and generated copper porphyry gold deposits. Bisbee, Arizona, 92 miles southeast of Tucson experienced secondary oxidation and enrichment to form high-quality malachite and azurite.

Southern Arizona was uplifted and experienced volcanic eruptions, which deposited high silica ash to the north as the Chinle Formation, which created the petrified wood of Petrified Forest National Park. Through the Jurassic, a large coastal desert similar to the modern Sahara or Namib desert occupied northern Arizona into Utah. Volcanic material is interbedded with dune sandstones in the Santa Rita Mountains, to the south of Tucson and correlate with the Aztec Sandstone and Navaja Sandstone, spanning northern Arizona to Zion National Park.

In the Cretaceous, the Sevier orogeny took place further west in California from 140 to 89 million years ago and was also related to the subducting Farallon plate. However, unlike the Nevadan orogeny, there was no significant vein-related mineral formation in Arizona. The region retreated to marine conditions and clam shells built a limestone deposit around Bisbee. Unlike in the past, the marine transgression originated to the southeast and the east of the Western Interior Seaway. Rising and falling seas from the east deposited shale and sandstone, as sediments from the Sevier orogeny shed into eastward. Coal deposits formed in a swampy coastal environment.

Many impacts of older mountain building events were overprinted and re-mineralized by the Laramide orogeny, 89 to 43 million years ago, which built the Rocky Mountains. Volcanic activity, magmatism and mineralization shifted eastward into Arizona. Small intrusions and volcanic centers record the first phase of the Laramide orogeny in southern Arizona from 76 to 67 million years ago. Copper-gold porphyry mineralization appeared in western Arizona, as well as in neighboring New Mexico. The main Laramide phase from 79 to 67 million years ago created massive volcanic centers, which erupted huge volumes of andesite and rhyolite ash. These calderas collapsed on themselves, leaving behind remnants such as the Cat Mountain Rhyolite, to the west of Tucson. Cobbles and gigantic boulders, as large as houses form sedimentary rocks in a matrix of volcanic material. Silver, lead and zinc deposited from hydrothermal solutions in radial and ring fractures in the rock.

=== Cenozoic (66 million years ago-present) ===
Due to flat subduction during the final phase of the Laramide orogeny from 54 to 43 million years ago in the Eocene epoch of the Cenozoic, deep intrusion of granite and pegmatite took place, 23 kilometers below the surface. Granitic plutons tended to form near well-developed crush zone and often have tungsten and quartz rich veins in garnet-muscovite granitoids and pegmatite dikes. The Santa Catalina Mountains north and northeast of Tucson contain the Wilderness Granite, which formed as an intrusion 14 miles below the surface. The Colorado Plateau uplifted and began to erode during the Eocene.

During the Eocene, Oligocene and Miocene, the Mid-Tertiary ignimbrite flare-up, a mountain building event tied to the Farallon Plate, erupted huge quantities of volcanic ash. Many small mountain ranges in western Arizona, including the Superstition, Galiuro, Chiricahua and Tumacacori mountains are predominantly made up of ash flow tuff from these eruptions.

The eruptions are believed to have been partly the result of increasing steep slab subduction into the mantle and magmatic activity shifted from the east to the west, bringing with it changes in mineralogy and rock types. Small basins accumulated volcanic debris, conglomerate and lacustrine gypsum, clay and carbonates. Lava flows and granite intrusions built up the Galiuro Mountains and Chiricahua Mountains. Gold and copper veins mineralized in dike swarms, followed by caldera-related batholiths and silver-lead-zinc skarns. Low angle normal and detachment faults deformed sedimentary and volcanic rocks from the final phase of the event.

In the last 14 million years of the Miocene, Pliocene, Pleistocene and the current Holocene, the subducting Farallon slab was cut off by strike-slip motion on the San Andreas Fault, coupled with a transform boundary. The slab has continued to descend, but with less force driving it. As a result, steep normal faults formed the horst and graben landscape of the Basin and Range Province. Basalt intruded into the basins and evaporites and other sediments accumulated, including salt beneath Phoenix, clay and zeolites in the Bowie area and gypsum in both the San Pedro and Verde valleys.

The Sentinel volcanic field, west of Casa Grande, and the San Francisco volcanic field to the north of Flagstaff both formed in basins, extruded in the last five million years. Additionally, deep peridotite was brought to the surface in basalt flows in the San Bernardino volcanic field in the southeast.

== Hydrogeology ==
Because of its arid climate and large population, water is critically important in the state of Arizona. Most drinking water is drawn from surface water sources, including Bureau of Reclamation dams and the Central Arizona Project diversion. Much of this surface water is from the Colorado River. Groundwater serves to augment surface water. Between 1915 and 1983, an estimated 81 million acre feet of groundwater was pumped in the vicinity of Phoenix, to complement surface water from the Salt River, Verde River and Agua Fria River. In urban areas, groundwater is now mainly recharged from excess irrigation, urban surface runoff, canal seepage and years of higher than average rainfall. In 1978, the US Geological Survey found a 350-foot decline in the level of the water table.

The USGS published research in 1997, examining the Pennsylvanian and Permian age sandstone, limestone and siltstone underlying Flagstaff and the southern Colorado Plateau, which forms a complex regional aquifer with poorly understood groundwater flow. A subsequent in-depth study in 2016 looked into Coconino County and Yavapai County in the north-central part of the state. The area is underlain by the C aquifer and Redwall-Muav aquifer. The C aquifer is a water-table aquifer, with a depth of up to 1500 feet to the water table and is dry in the west, except for perched water-bearing zones. It is underlain by the Redwall-Muav, confined and up to 3200 feet below the land surface. Groundwater was up to 7000 years old in the C aquifer and up to 22,000 years old in the Redwall-Muav, based on tritium and carbon-14 analysis. For the most part, water from these aquifers is high quality although some wells exceed EPA recommendations for arsenic, barium, uranium and lead. Both aquifers have seen extensive pumping increases since 1975.

== Natural resource geology ==
The Santa Rita Mountains and Tombstone Hills contain silver and lead formed by hydrothermal fluids in fractures, during the Laramide orogeny. Arizona is known as the Copper State because it produces two-thirds of US copper annually. Laramide copper porphyry deposits are common around Tucson and include the Twin Buttes, Sierrita-Esperanza, Rosemont, Silver Bell and Mission-Pima mines, as well as the historical Ajo mine to the west. The Ray, Miami, Pinto Valley, Morenci, Safford, Carlota, Superior and Resolution mines are examples of open-pit extraction sites for copper in east-central Arizona.

These deposits typically have a bulls-eye pattern of mineralization ranging from copper and zinc at the center to zinc, lead, silver and gold in the periphery and silver and manganese on the outer edge.

Secondary copper enrichment and oxidation have yielded minerals with even higher copper concentrations, including chalcopyrite, chalcocite, azurite, malachite and chrysocolla. Additionally, skarn deposits are common near plutons, where contact metamorphism with granite magma generates garnet or calcium silicate. The Aravapai, Castle Dome, California, Middle Pass, Swisshelm and Ash Peak mining districts all resulted from the Mid-Tertiary mountain building event.
