= Mazatzal Group =

Geologic formation in Arizona, US

- Stratigraphic range: Statherian
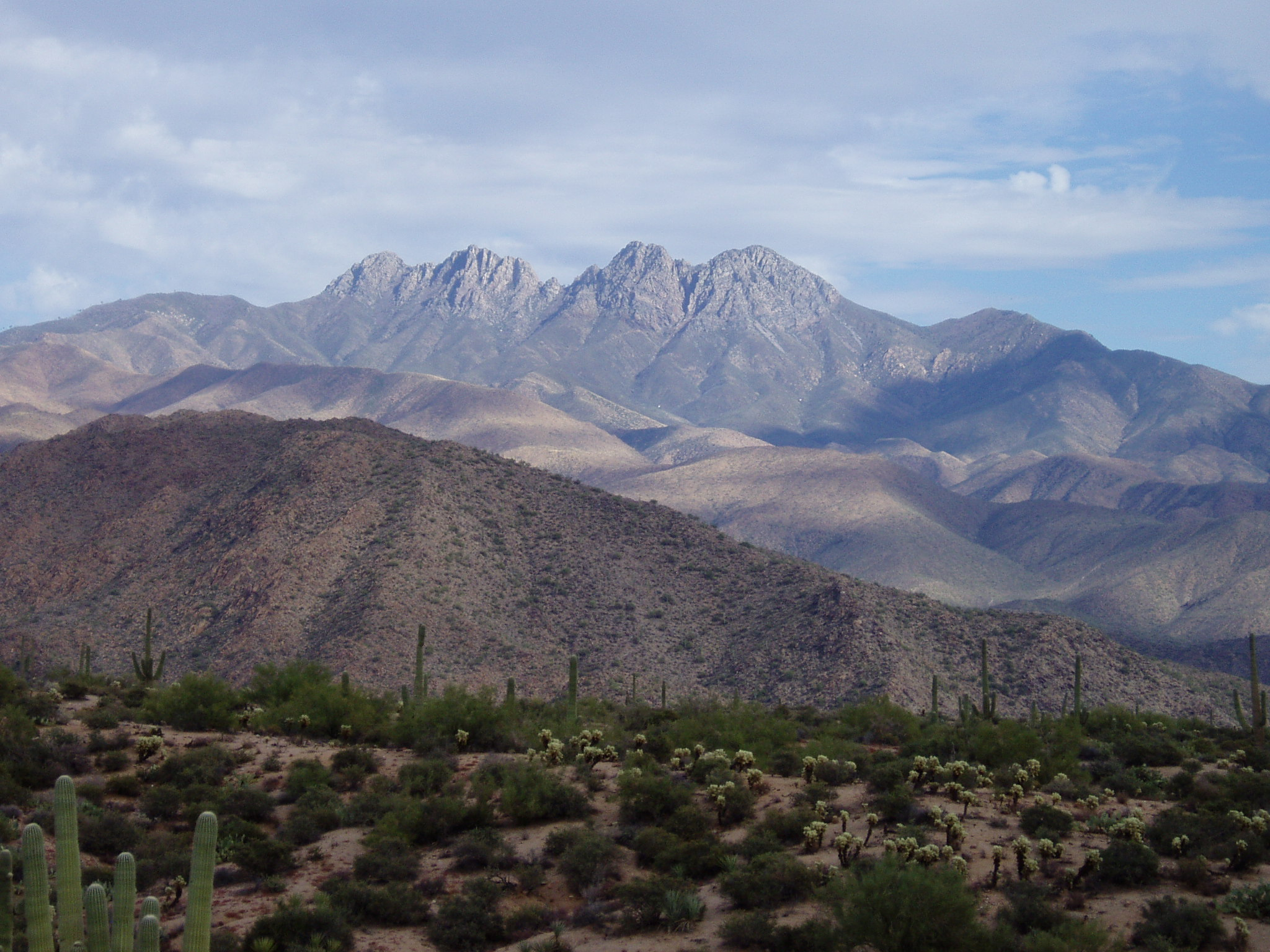
- Mazatzal Group underlies the Four Peaks, Mazatzal Mountains, Arizona, US
- Type: Group
- Unit of: Tonto Basin Supergroup
- Underlies: Hopi Springs Shale
- Overlies: Red Rock Rhyolite
- Thickness: 2,000 m (6,600 ft)

Lithology
- Primary: Quartzite
- Other: Metaconglomerate

Location
- Coordinates: 33°41′02″N 111°19′30″W
- Region: Central Arizona
- Country: United States

Type section
- Named for: Mazatzal Mountains
- Named by: E.D. Wilson
- Year defined: 1922
- Mazatzal Group (Arizona)

The Mazatzal Group is a group of geologic formations that crops out in portions of central Arizona, US. Detrital zircon geochronology establishes a maximum age for the formation of 1660 to 1630 million years (Mya), in the Statherian period of the Precambrian. The group gives its name to the Mazatzal orogeny, a mountain-building event that took place between 1695 and 1630 Mya.

== Description ==
The Mazatzal Group consists mostly of fine-grained light-brown to gray quartzite which often shows cross-bedding; metaconglomerate containing clasts up to 15 centimeters (6 in) or more in size; and occasional lenses, up to 46 meters (150 ft) in thickness, of maroon to gray argillite showing ripple marks and mudcracks. The lower beds of the group are intruded by rhyolite domes and sills. The total thickness of the group is up to 2,000 meters (6,600 ft). The group lies disconformably on top of the Red Rock Rhyolite and is in turn overlain by the Hopi Springs Shale.

The group crops out in the Mazatzal Mountains, where it has been strongly deformed (with up to 50% shortening to the northwest) and in the Prescott area, where it has been only mildly metamorphosed. It is also present in the upper Salt River canyon. The group gives its name to the Mazatzal orogeny, a mountain-building event that took place between 1695 and 1630 Mya.

=== Members ===
In the northern Mazatzal Mountains, the Mazatzal Group is divided (in ascending stratigraphic order) into the Deadman Quartzite, the Maverick Shale, and the Mazatzal Peak Quartzite. In the upper Salt River Canyon, the Mazatzal Group is represented by the White Ledges Formation.

In the Four Peaks area, the Mazatzal Group is divided (in ascending stratigraphic order) into an informal lower quartzite, an informal lower pelite, and the Four Peaks Quartzite. These are interpreted as a single sequence of sediment deposition. The lower quartzite is an extremely pure quartzite up to 60 meters (200 ft) thick. The lower pelite is about 450 meters (1,480 ft) thick and consists of pelite and psammite beds. The Four Peaks Quartzite is up to 400 meters (1,300 ft) thick and is mostly extremely pure quartzite with a few pelite layers.

== History of investigation ==
The unit was first described by E.D. Wilson in 1922 as the Mazatzal Quartzite. It was raised to group rank in 1981 by P. Anderson and W.R. Wirth. The group was assigned to the Tonto Basin Supergroup in 1988 by Karl Karlstrom and Samuel Bowring.
