= Picuris Formation =

Geologic formation in New Mexico

- Stratigraphic range: late Eocene to early Miocene; 34.5–15 Ma
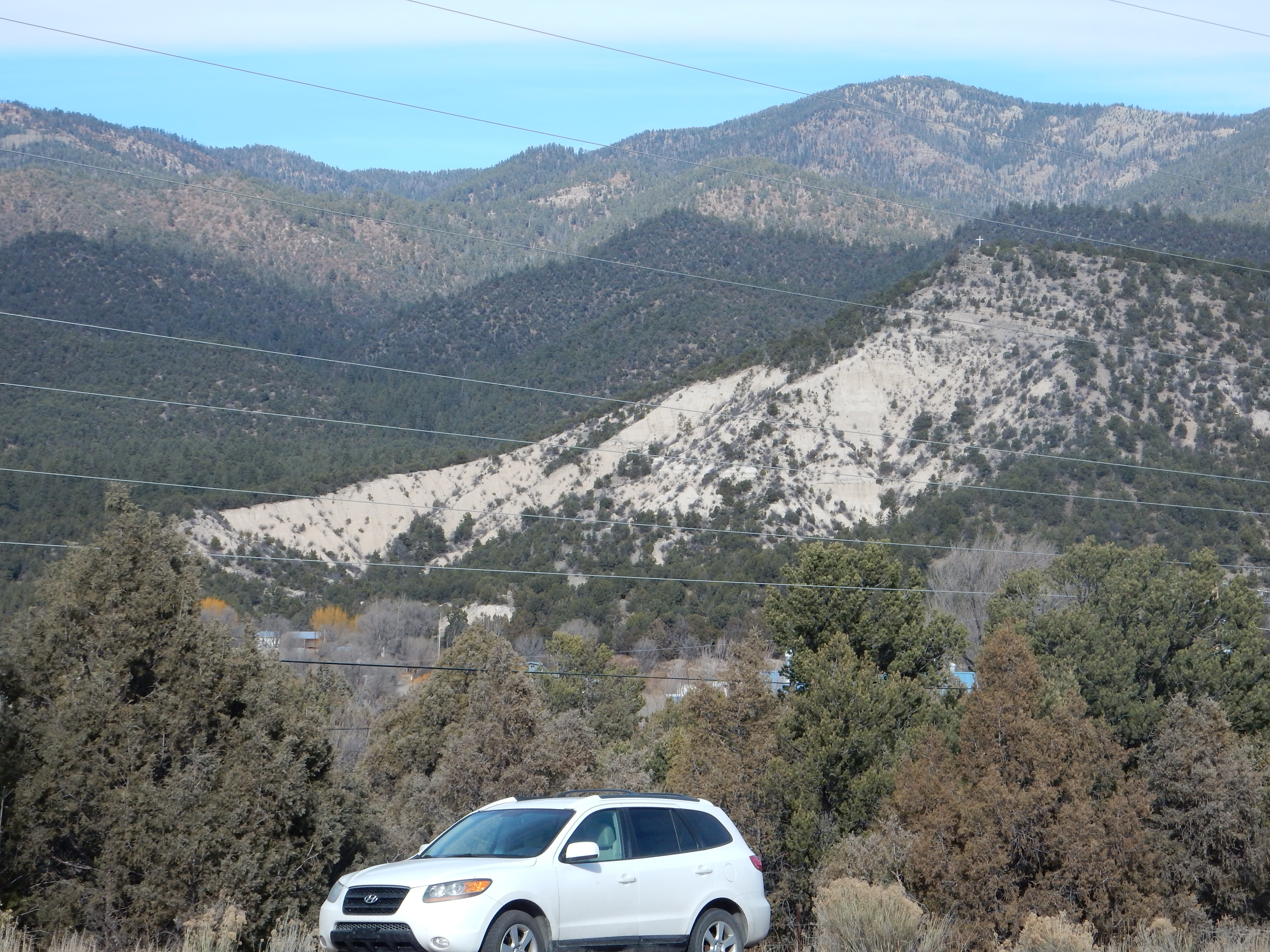
- Picuris Formation north of Vadito, New Mexico, USA
- Type: Formation
- Underlies: Tesuque Formation
- Thickness: 1,200 ft (370 m)

Lithology
- Primary: conglomerate
- Other: Sandstone

Location
- Coordinates: 36.198°N 105.677°W
- Region: Taos County, New Mexico
- Country: United States

Type section
- Named by: E.C. Cabot
- Year defined: 1938
- Picuris Formation (the United States) Picuris Formation (New Mexico)

The Picuris Formation is a geologic formation exposed in the eastern flank of the Rio Grande rift in northern New Mexico. It was deposited from the late Eocene to Miocene epochs.

== Description ==
The formation consists mostly of tuffaceous conglomerate and sandstone with a thickness of more than 1,200 feet (370 m).

The formation is divided into three informal members. These are a lower conglomerate member, a middle tuffaceous member, and an upper volcaniclastic member. The lower member is a sandy or silty conglomerate containing mostly Hondo Group quartzite rock fragments (clasts) ranging in size from 2 millimetres (0.079 in) to over 2 meters (6.6 ft) in diameter. The conglomerate is greenish to pale yellow in color, poorly sorted, and moderately to well rounded. Ar-Ar geochronology indicates an age range from before 34.5 million years (Ma) to less than 28.3 Ma.

The middle member is a tuffaceous fine to pebbly sandstone. This is buff to yellowish in color, generally poorly cemented, and poorly sorted. However, some beds are highly silicified. The member contains some well-developed normal grading sequences a few to tens of centimeters thick. There are some interbeds and channel fills of conglomerate containing local Precambrian clasts, with more conglomerate towards the top. Some ash layers are bioturbated. Ash beds from the Amalia Tuff eruption have been identified within the member, with ages of 23 and 27 Ma, interpreted as pre- and post-caldera pumices. This member is at least 150 meters (490 ft) thick. Based on Ar-Ar geochronology, this member was deposited from 28.3 to less than 23 Ma.

The upper member is red to purple volcaniclastic conglomerate and sandstone, typically carbonate cemented. Individual bed contacts are abrupt and the lower bed is often scoured. A basalt clast from the base of the member has an age of 19.78 +/- 0.24 Ma, and the member as a whole spans the age range of less than 19.8 Ma to about 15 Ma. This member is overlain by the Dixon Member of the Tesuque Formation.

Cabot included tuffaceous beds just north of Santa Fe in the Picuris Formation, but the correlation of this Bishop's Lodge Member remains controversial, with some geologists keeping it with the Picuris Formation, others assigning it to the Tesuque Formation, and others more recently assigning it to the Espinaso Formation.

The formation is of unusual interest in that it spans the transition from Laramide crustal shortening to Rio Grande rift crustal extension.

== History of investigation ==
The formation was first named by E.C. Cabot in 1938, likely for exposures in the Picuris Mountains north of Vadito, New Mexico.
