= Blackjack Mountains, Arizona =

Mountain range in Gila County, Arizona, US

Blackjack Mountains
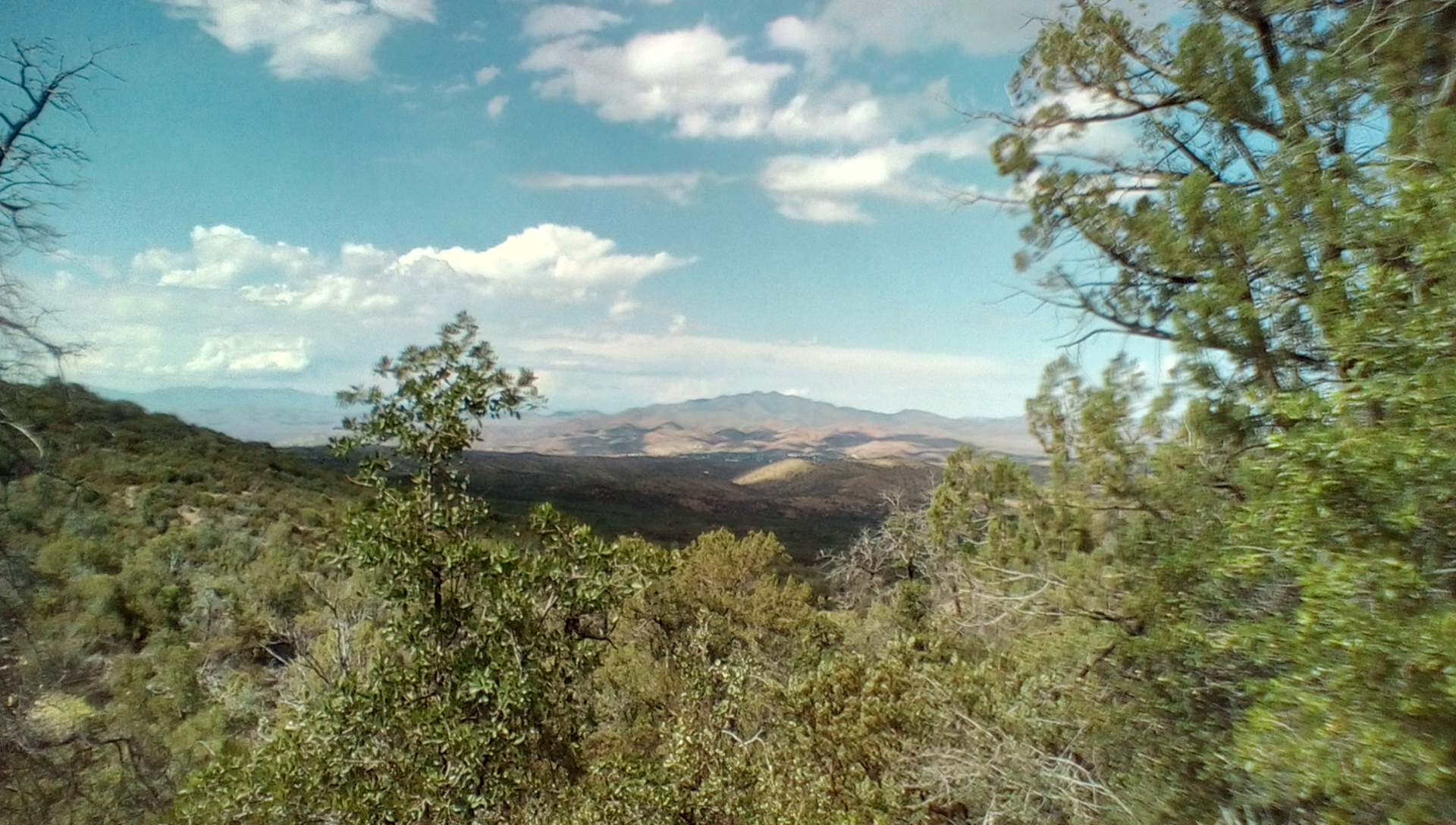
- View of the Blackjack Mountains, AZ from a distance. They are center right, in the distance.

Highest point
- Elevation: 6,942 ft (2,116 m)
- Prominence: 2,580 ft (790 m)
- Coordinates: 33°32′26″N 110°44′33″W at Apache Peaks

Geography
- Location: Gila County, Arizona

The Blackjack Mountains are a mountain range located in Gila County, Arizona, United States. They have a maximum elevation of 6,942 ft (2,116 m) at Apache Peaks and a prominence of 2,580 ft (790 m). The peak has a topographic isolation of 17.88 miles (29 km), with the nearest higher peak lying to the south in the Pinal Mountains. The Blackjack mountains are located within the Tonto National Forest and are north of Globe, Arizona. The high point of the range, Apache Peaks, is ranked 36th in prominence for Arizona's most prominent peaks.
