= Mazatzal Wilderness =

Protected area in Arizona

- IUCN category Ib (wilderness area)
- Location within the United States
- Location: Yavapai and Gila counties, Arizona, United States
- Nearest city: Payson (town)
- Coordinates: 34°08′45″N 111°33′53″W
- Area: 252,390 acres (102,140 ha)
- Established: 1964
- Governing body: U.S. Forest Service

Mazatzal Wilderness is a wilderness area of about 390 square miles (1,000 km^{2}) in Yavapai and Gila counties in the U.S. state of Arizona. The wilderness is within the Tonto and Coconino national forests. The town of Payson is to the east, and the Verde River is to the west. During summer, temperatures in the wilderness often exceed 110 °F (43 °C).

The wilderness lies within the following quadrangles of the national topographic map of the United States Geological Survey: Cypress Butte, Table Mountain, Hackberry Mountain, Lion Mountain, Strawberry, Verde Hot Springs, Cane Springs Mountain, Horseshoe Dam, Wet Bottom Mesa, North Peak, and Chalk Mountain.

Elevations range from 2,100 feet (640 m) feet at Sheep Bridge along the river to 7,903 feet (2,409 m) on Mazatzal Peak. The flora varies from desert shrubs at the lower elevations to grassland plants to manzanita, shrub live oak, and other mountain shrubs. Scattered pinyon-juniper woodlands, ponderosa pines, and Douglas-fir are found at higher elevations.

About 240 miles (390 km) of trails cross the wilderness. These include the Verde River Trail, which follows the river for about 28 miles (45 km) and the Mazatzal Divide Trail, which runs north–south for about 29 miles (47 km).

== See also ==
- List of Arizona Wilderness Areas
- List of U.S. Wilderness Areas
- Wilderness Act
