= White Ledges Formation =

Geologic formation in Arizona, US

- Stratigraphic range: Statherian
- Type: Formation
- Unit of: Hess Canyon Group
- Underlies: Yankee Joe Formation
- Thickness: 300 m (980 ft)

Lithology
- Primary: Quartzite, argillaceous rocks

Location
- Coordinates: 33°42′N 110°43′W
- Region: Arizona
- Country: United States

Type section
- Named for: White Ledges (see text)
- Named by: D.E. Livingston
- Year defined: 1969
- White Ledges Formation (Arizona)

The White Ledges Formation is a geologic formation that crops out in central Arizona, US. Detrital zircon geochronology establishes a maximum age for the formation of 1726 million years (Mya), in the Statherian period of the Precambrian. The formation is typical of quartzites deposited around 1650 million years ago in the southwestern part of Laurentia, the ancient core of the North American continent.

== Description ==
The White Ledges Formation consists of 300 meters (980 ft) of orthoquartzite. The quartzite is cut by small reverse faults dipping to the north. It is the lowest member of the Hess Canyon Group and is disconformably overlain by the Yankee Joe Formation. It overlies and interfingers with the Redmond Formation, which has been radiometrically dated as 1657 ± 3 million years old, and it contains detrital zircons dated to not less than 1726 million years old.

The White Ledges Formation is thought to be sediments deposited in a nearshore tidal and fluvial environment. Together with other formations in the region, it records a long-lived tectonic margin along southern Laurentia through much of the Proterozoic (1800 to 1000 million years ago.) This helps geologists reconstruct the assembly and breakup of supercontinents during this interval of time.

== History of investigation ==
The beds making up the formation were first noted by N.H. Darton in 1925, who assigned them to the Pinal Schist. The White Ledges Formation was first designated by D.E. Livingston in 1969 in his doctoral dissertation and named for the White Ledges, a set of quartzite ridges along the Salt River canyon north of Globe, Arizona.
