= Mazatzal Mountains =

Landform in Arizona, United States

Coordinates: 33°42′31″N 111°21′53″W

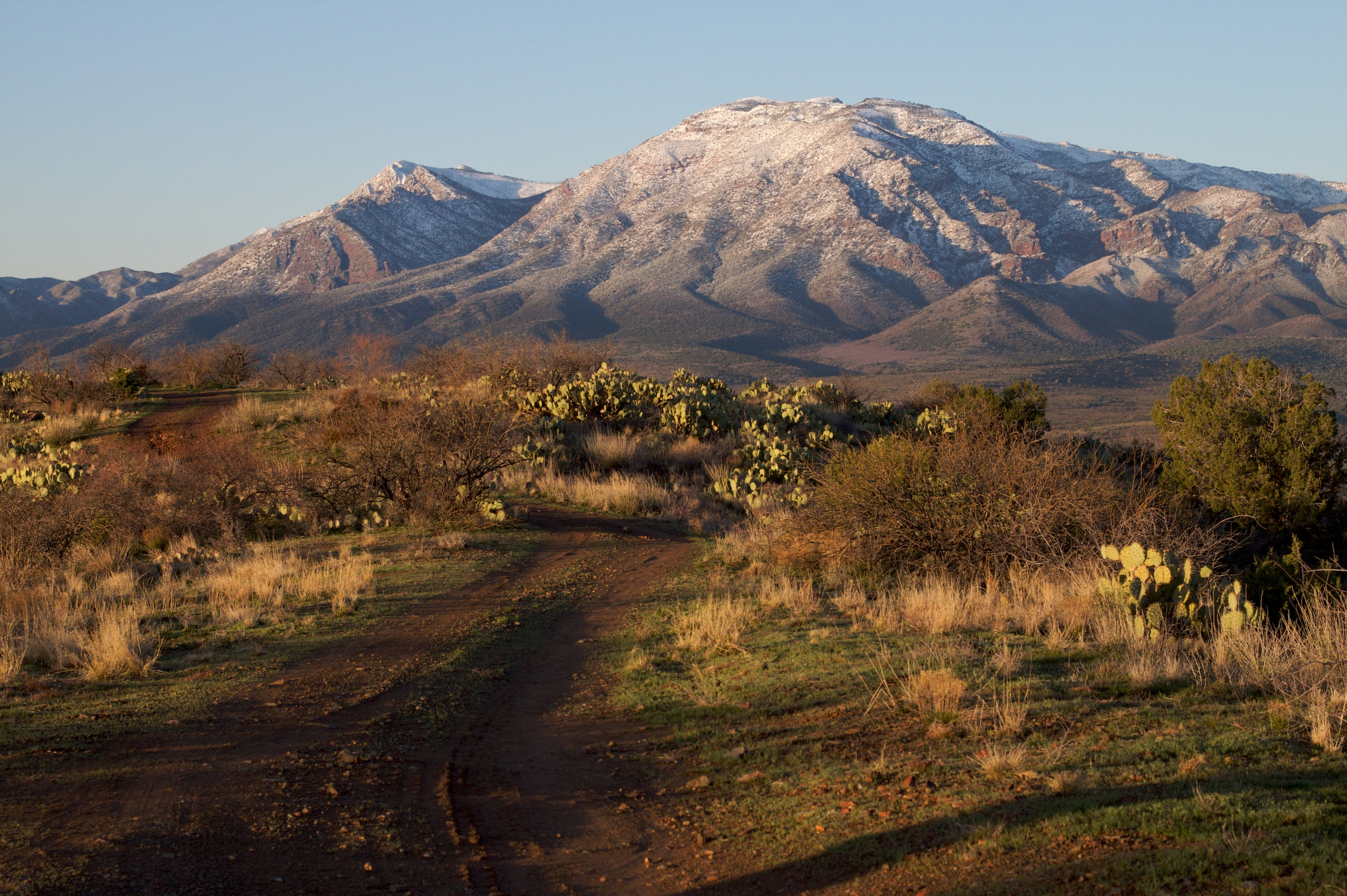
East side of the Mazatzal Mountains, March 2010

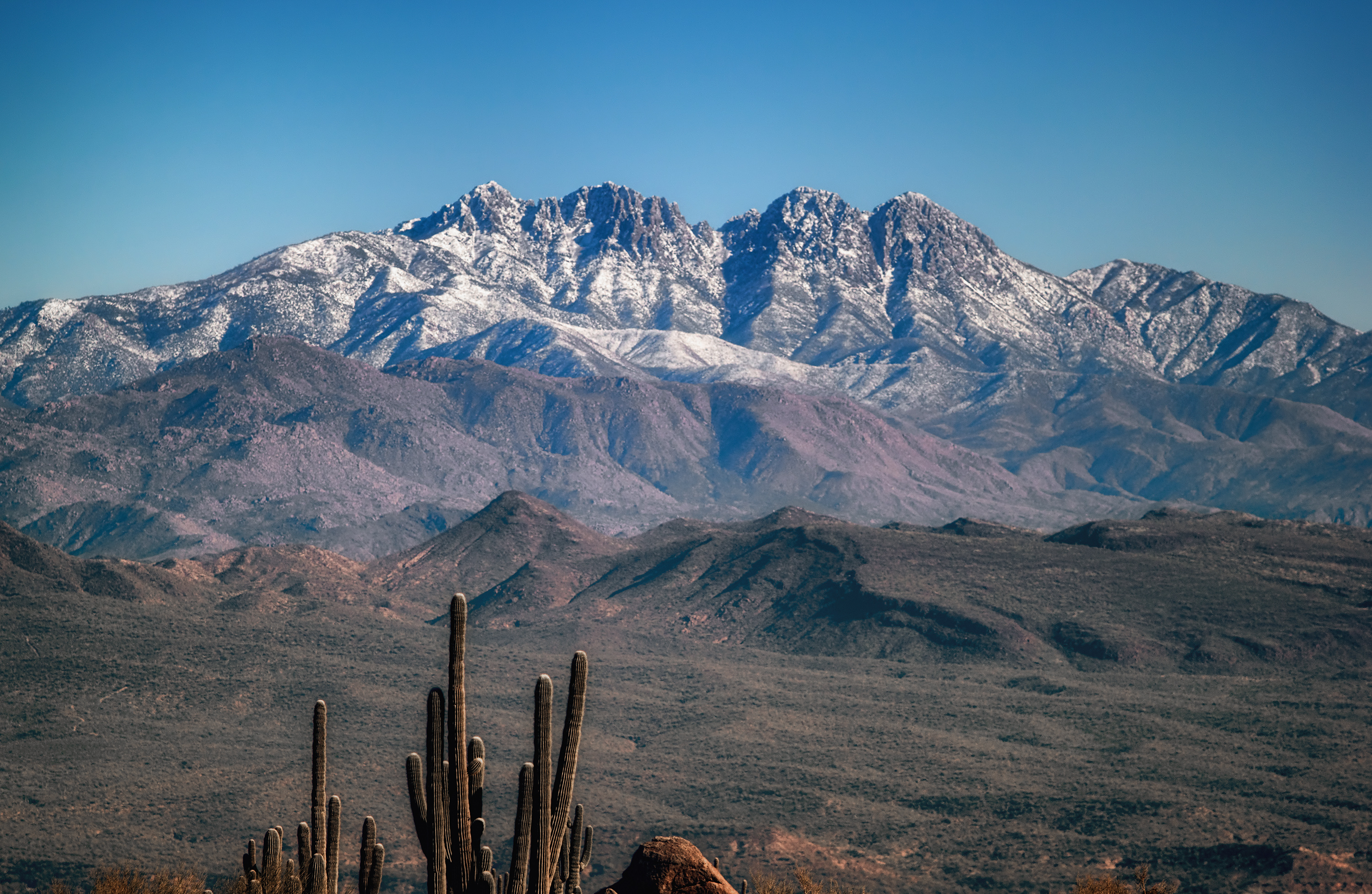
Four Peaks with a snow dusting, from the McDowell Sonoran Preserve, Scottsdale. January 2016

The Mazatzal Mountains (MAH-zaht-ZAL, locally Ma-tuh-ZEL) are a mountain range in south central Arizona, about 30–45 miles northeast of the Phoenix metropolitan area. The origin of the name remains obscure but one possibility is that it is from the Nahuatl language meaning "place of the deer". The crest of the Mazatzals forms the county line between Maricopa County and Gila County. SR 87, the Beeline Highway, traverses the Mazatzals on its way to Payson. The highest peak is Mazatzal Peak at 7,903 feet (2,409 m). They also include the Four Peaks, with elevation 7,659 ft, 2,334 m; a prominent mountain and landmark of the eastern Phoenix area.

The Mazatzal Wilderness Area protects 252,500 acres (1,022 km^{2}) of the Tonto and Coconino National forests. Established in 1940 and expanded to its present size in 1984, elevations range from 2,100 feet (640 m) at Sheep Bridge in the southwest to 7,903 feet (2,409 m) on Mazatzal Peak.

The eastern side of the wilderness consists of brush- or pine-covered mountains, sometimes broken by narrow, vertical-walled canyons. On its west side below the steep brush-covered foothills, the Verde River flows through the Sonoran Desert. The Verde was designated by the U.S. Congress as one of Arizona's two Wild and Scenic Rivers in 1984.

== Great Unconformity, Mazatzal Wilderness region ==
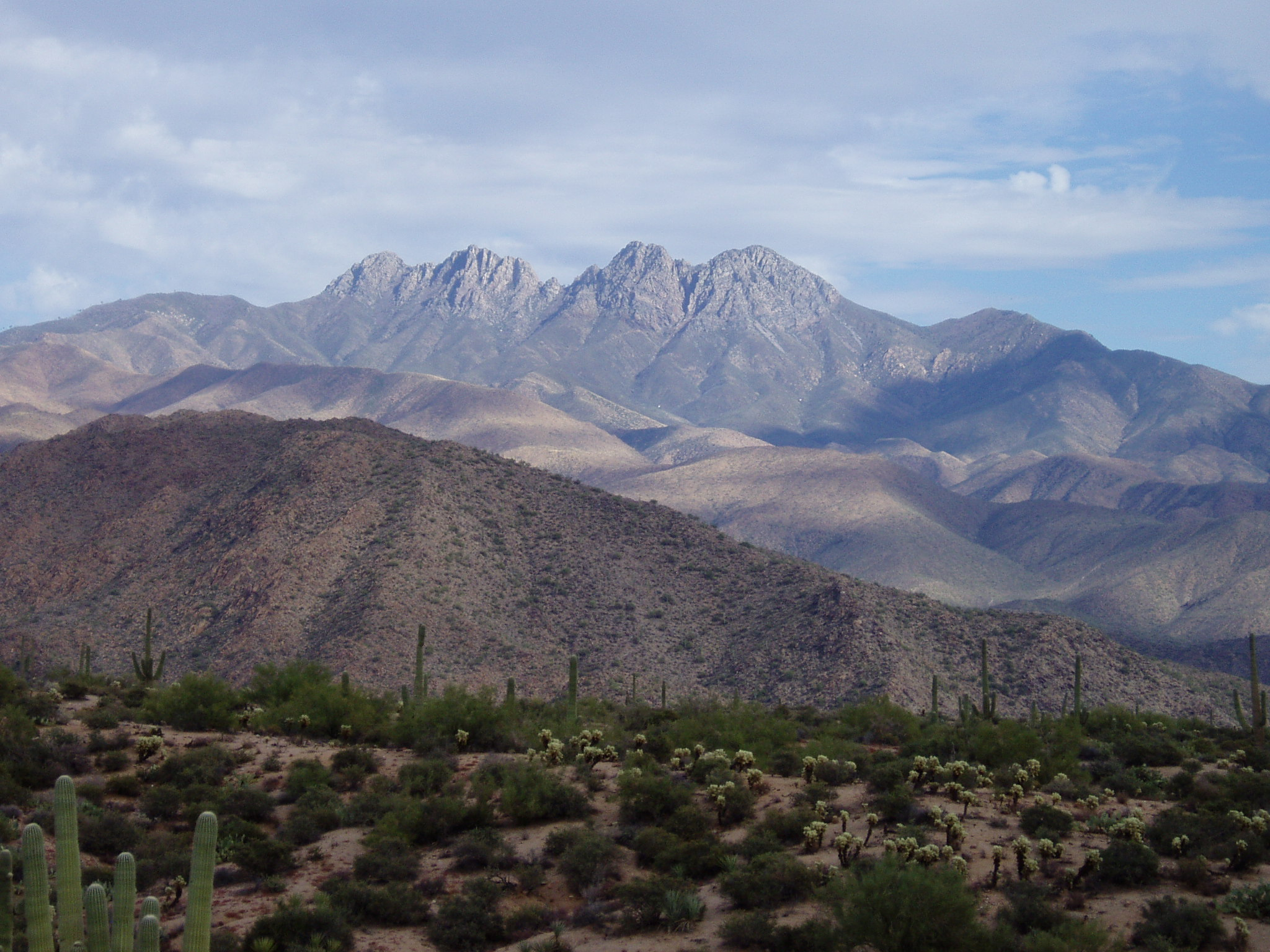
The Four Peaks in the Mazatzal Mountains

At Pine, on Arizona State Route 87, at the northeast region of the Mazatzal Wilderness, north terminus of the Mazatzal Mountains, the route traverses the contact between two important geologic units. The horizontally laid Tapeats Sandstone, (common areal extent in Grand Canyon), was deposited on Precambrian granite, the Zoroaster Granite. The time between the erosion of the lower unit and deposition of the horizontal sandstone above, is about 1 billion years (1,000 million years), and is named the Great Unconformity. Besides its occurrence in the Grand Canyon, it is also found west, in the Las Vegas Valley, at Frenchman Mountain. The Zoroaster Granite and other granites, were intruded into the major unit of the Vishnu Schist, the basement paleo unit found in the Inner Gorge region of the Grand Canyon. The neighboring Sierra Ancha range has another occurrence of the Great Unconformity, with a sandstone unit that is an analogue of the Tapeats Sandstone.

The Arizona 87 highway section south of Pine is where the north Mazatzal Mountains merge into the western region of the Mogollon Rim, as the Rim continues northwest into the Oak Creek Canyon region.

== Sources and external links ==
- Mazatzal Wilderness Hikes at HikeArizona.COM
- Mazatzal Wilderness Area at USFS
- Mazatzal Wilderness Area at wilderness.net
- Geology of the Mazatzal Mountains, Central Arizona
- Mazatzal Mountains & Wilderness Area Hiking
