= List of Ancestral Puebloan dwellings in Arizona =

This is a list of Ancestral Puebloan dwellings in Arizona.

== Locations ==
Site name	Pueblo peoples	Nearest town (modern name)	Location	Type	Description	Photo
Unknown	Ancestral Puebloan	St. Michaels	End of Yellow Meadow Road, Navajo Nation	Single Dwelling	Ruins located on the Navajo Nation	
Agate House	Ancestral Puebloan	Holbrook	Petrified Forest National Park	Eight-room dwelling	Ruins located in the Petrified Forest National Park	
Antelope House		Canyon de Chelly			Ruins located in Canyon de Chelly National Monument	
Awatovi		Navajo County			Ruins	
Bailey Ruin	Ancestral Puebloan	Pinedale, Arizona			Ruins of a multistoried pueblo of 200–250 rooms, AD 1275–1325 (late Pueblo III Era and/or early Pueblo IV Era).	
Betatakin	Ancestral Puebloan	Kayenta	Navajo Reservation	Grand house	Ruins located at the Navajo National Monument.	
Box Canyon Ruins		Flagstaff			Ruins located in the Wupatki National Monument.	
Canyon Creek Ruins	Salado				Ruins located in the Sierra Ancha Wilderness	
Casa Grande	Hohokam	Coolidge			Ruins	
Casa Malpaís		Springerville			Ruins, National Historic Landmark	
Cerro Prieto	Hohokam			Trincheras	Ruins	
Chichilticalli					Ruins. Chichilticalli is in southern Arizona in the Sulfur Springs Valley, within the bend of the Dos Cabeza and Chiricahua Mountains.	
Citadel	Sinagua	Flagstaff			Ruins located in the Wupatki National Monument.	
Cold Springs Ruins	Salado				Ruins, located in the Sierra Ancha Wilderness.	
Cooper Forks Canyon Ruins	Salado				Ruins located in the Sierra Ancha Wilderness.	
Devil's Chasm	Salado				Ruins located in the Sierra Ancha Wilderness.	
Elden	Sinagua	Flagstaff			Ruins	
Homolovi	Ancestral Puebloan	Winslow			Ruins located at Homolovi State Park	
Honanki	Sinagua	Sedona	Coconino National Forest	Cliff dwellings	Ruins	
Indian Mesa	Hohokam	Peoria	Lake Pleasant Regional Park	Village	Ruins	
Inscription House	Ancestral Puebloan	Kayenta	Navajo Reservation	Grand house	Ruins located at the Navajo National Monument	
Kiet Siel	Ancestral Puebloan	Kayenta	Navajo Reservation	Grand house	Ruins located at the Navajo National Monument.	
Kinishba	Mogollon	Whiteriver		Great house	Ruins. Including more than 600 rooms, this great house is a National Historic Landmark located on the Fort Apache Indian Reservation.	
Kinnazinde					Ruins.	
Lomaki	Sinagua	Flagstaff			Ruins located in the Wupatki National Monument.	
Los Morteros	Hohokam			Trincheras	Ruins.	
Montezuma Castle	Sinagua				Ruins. A National Monument.	
Nalakihu	Sinagua	Flagstaff			Ruins located in the Wupatki National Monument.	
Old Oraibi	Hopi	Oraibi		Great house	Active with ruins on-site. Listed on the National Register of Historic Places and declared a National Historic Landmark.	
Palatki	Sinagua	Sedona	Coconino National Forest	Cliff dwellings	Ruins located on the Palatki Heritage Site.	
Pueblo Canyon Ruins	Salado				Ruins. Located in the Sierra Ancha Wilderness.	
Pueblo Grande		Phoenix			Ruins. A National Historic Landmark.	
Puerco Pueblo	Ancestral Puebloan	Holbrook	Petrified Forest National Park	100-room pueblo community	Ruins. A single story, rectangular structure surrounding an interior courtyard.	
Sierra Ancha	Salado			Cliff dwellings	Ruins.	
Sliding House		Chinle			Ruins located in Canyon de Chelly National Monument.	
Snaketown		Phoenix			Ruins. Located in the Hohokam Pima National Monument, it is listed as a National Historic Landmark and is on the National Register of Historic Places.	
Tumamoc Hill	Hohokam			Trincheras	Ruins.	
Tusayan	Ancestral Puebloan	Grand Canyon Village	Grand Canyon National Park		Ruins located in the Grand Canyon.	
Tuzigoot	Sinagua	Clarkdale			Ruins. A National Monument.	
Upper ruin	Salado	Roosevelt			Ruins. The pueblo sits in the Tonto National Monument Archeological District, which is listed on the National Register of Historic Places and is located in the Tonto National Monument.	
Walnut Canyon	Sinagua	Flagstaff			Ruins, national monument	
White House	Ancestral Puebloan (Chaco outlier)	Chinle	Canyon de Chelly National Monument	Cliff dwellings	Ruins.	
Wukoki	Sinagua	Flagstaff			Ruins located in the Wupatki National Monument.	

== See also ==
- History of Arizona
