= List of the oldest buildings in Arizona =

This article lists the oldest extant buildings in Arizona, including extant buildings and structures constructed during Spanish, Mexican, and early American rule over Arizona. Only buildings built prior to 1850 are suitable for inclusion on this list, or the building must be the oldest of its type.

In order to qualify for the list, a structure must:

- be a recognizable building (defined as any human-made structure used or intended for supporting or sheltering any use or continuous occupancy);
- incorporate features of building work from the claimed date to at least 1.5 metres (4.9 ft) in height and/or be a listed building.

This consciously excludes ruins of limited height, roads and statues. Bridges may be included if they otherwise fulfill the above criteria. Dates for many of the oldest structures have been arrived at by radiocarbon dating or dendrochronology and should be considered approximate. If the exact year of initial construction is estimated, it will be shown as a range of dates.

== List of oldest buildings ==
Building	Image	Location	First built	Use	Notes
Agua Fria National Monument		near Phoenix, Arizona	250-1450 C.E	Residences	
Canyon de Chelly National Monument		in Four Corners region	350-1300	Residences	
Montezuma Castle National Monument		Camp Verde, Arizona	1100-1425	Residence	
Casa Grande Ruins National Monument		near Coolidge, Arizona	1150–1450	Residences	
Tonto National Monument		near Globe, Arizona	1200s-1400s	Residences	
Sycamore Canyon Cliff Dwelling		near Clarkdale, Arizona	1200s-1400s	Residences	
Navajo National Monument cliff dwellings		Kayenta, Arizona	1250	Residences	
Sierra Ancha Cliff Dwellings		Sierra Ancha Wilderness	1280-1350	Residences	
Mission San Xavier del Bac		San Xavier Indian Reservation near Tucson, Arizona	1783-1797	Church	Rebuilt in 1783 near site of an earlier razed church built in 1692 Likely the oldest Spanish colonial/European built structure in Arizona.
Cordova House		Tucson, Arizona	ca. 1848	Residence	Oldest house in Tucson; now part of Tucson Museum of Art
Duppa Homestead		Phoenix	1870	Residence	Adobe home of pioneer Phillip Darrell Duppa is likely oldest building in Phoenix

== See also ==
- National Register of Historic Places listings in Arizona
- Spanish missions in Arizona
- History of Arizona
- Oldest buildings in the United States
