= Sierra Ancha Cliff Dwellings =

Pre-Columbian dwellings

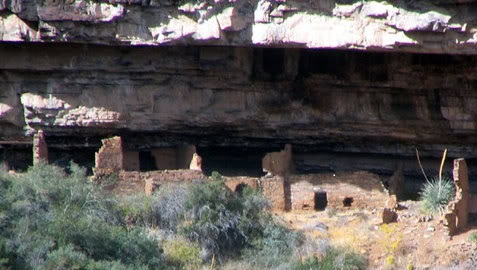
Cliff dwellings in the Sierra Anchas.

The Sierra Ancha Cliff Dwellings are a series of Pre-Columbian native American cliff-dwellings located in the Sierra Ancha Wilderness. They were built between 1280 and 1350, likely by the Salado people. The Sierra Ancha is home to several prominent ruin sites known as the Devil's Chasm Fortress, the Canyon Creek Ruins, the Pueblo Canyon Ruins, the Cold Springs Canyon Ruins, and the Cooper Forks Canyon Ruins. Collectively they have been called the Cherry Creek Ruins.

== See also ==
- Cliff Palace
- Montezuma's Castle
- Cherry Creek Campaign
- List of the oldest buildings in Arizona
