= Cordova House =

- U.S. National Register of Historic Places
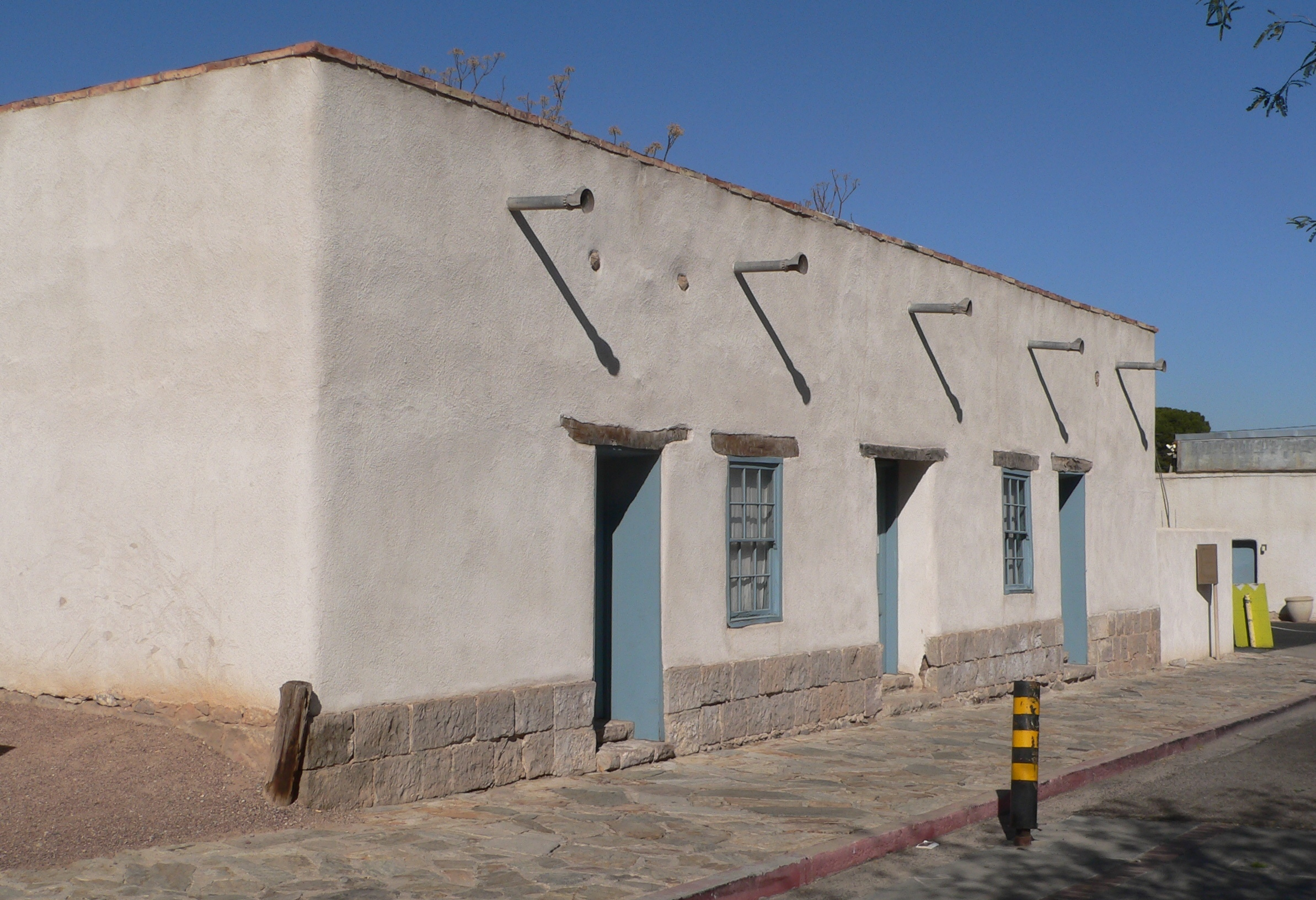

- Location within Arizona
- Location: 173--177 N. Meyer Ave., Tucson, Arizona
- Coordinates: 32°13′25″N 110°58′27″W
- Area: 0 acres (0 ha)
- Built: 1848
- NRHP reference No.: 72000198
- Added to NRHP: May 4, 1972

Cordova House (also known as La Casa Cordova) is a historic adobe house at 140 N. Main Avenue. It is possibly the oldest house in Tucson, Arizona, and one of the oldest surviving houses in Arizona.

Cordova House was believed to have been built of adobe around the time of the Gadsden Purchase in 1848 with the back two rooms being constructed first. Cordova House was owned by the Cordova family from 1936 to 1972. It is the site of Maria Luisa Tena's "El Nacimiento," the oldest and longest running Nativity display in the Southwest. Cordova House is also the site of a display about Cordova House's relationship within the context of 1960s urban renewal. The house was added to the National Register of Historic Places in 1972. The building is currently part of the Tucson Museum of Art.

== See also ==
- List of the oldest buildings in Arizona
