= Salado culture =

Culture of the people of the Salt River area of Arizona

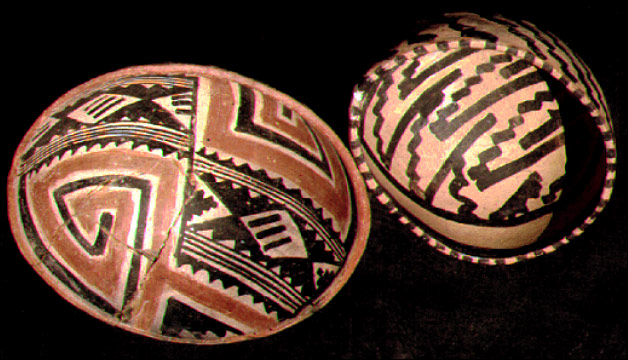
Salado Polychrome pottery, Tonto National Monument

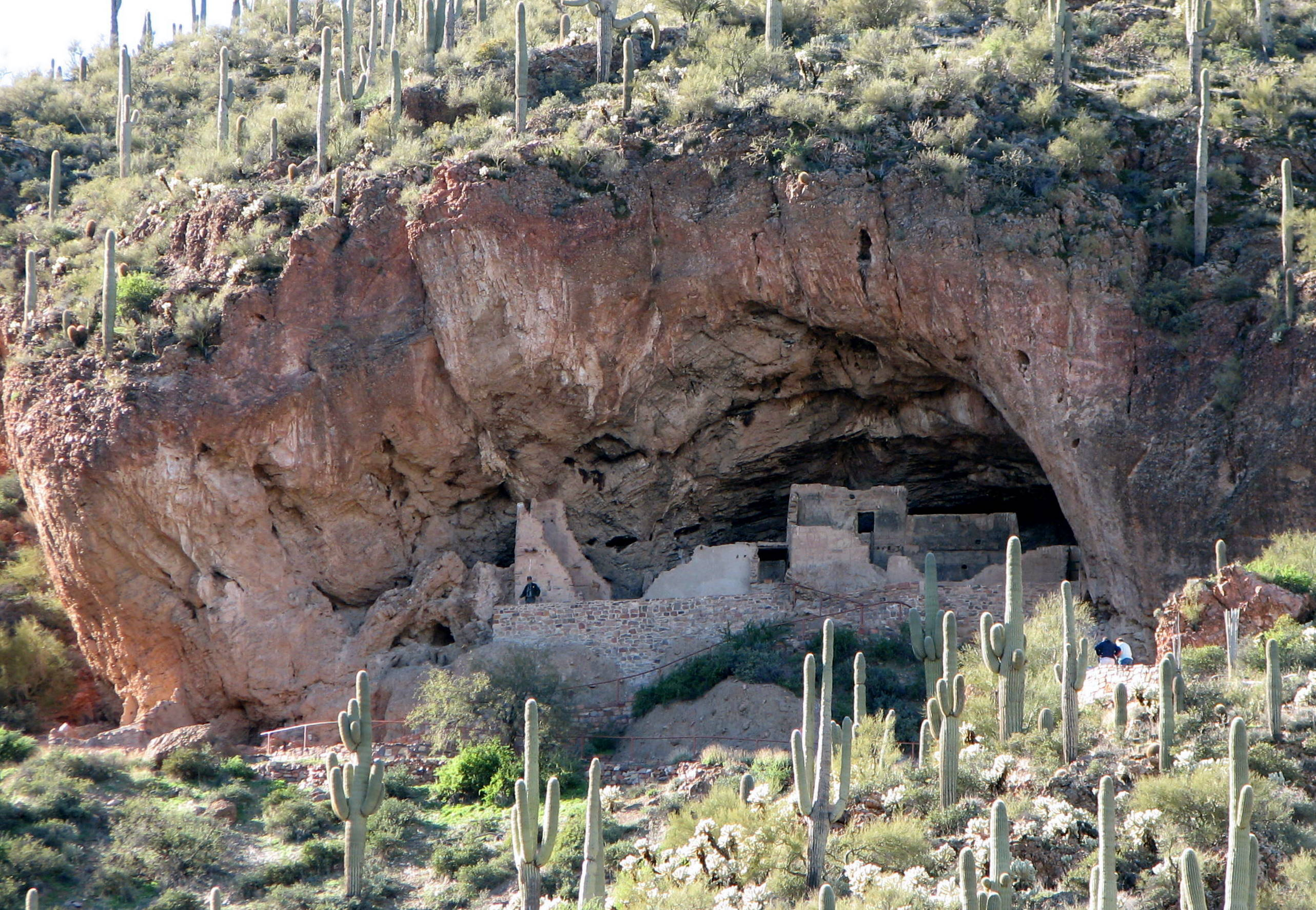
Lower Cliff Dwelling, Tonto National Monument

Salado culture, or Salado Horizon, was a human culture in the upper Salt River (río Salado) of the Tonto Basin in southeastern Arizona from approximately 1150 CE through the 15th century.

Distinguishing characteristics of the Salado include distinctive Salado Polychrome pottery, communities within walled adobe compounds, and burial of the dead (rather than cremation). The Salado were farmers, using simple irrigation techniques to water fields of maize, beans, pumpkins, amaranth, and cotton. They also hunted local game and gathered buds, leaves, and roots to supplement their diet. They traded with other cultures, as indicated by archaeological finds of seashells from the Gulf of California and macaw feathers from Mexico.

== Cliff dwellings ==
While the Salado communities of the river valley have been covered by Theodore Roosevelt Lake, elevated cliff dwellings remain. The cliff dwellings were built in the 14th century by Salado who moved up into the hills from the more crowded valleys. Two relatively intact cliff dwellings were set aside in 1907 by Theodore Roosevelt as Tonto National Monument.

The cliff dwellings of Tonto National Monument were constructed within natural recesses in siltstone hills surrounding Tonto Basin. The Salado used mud and rocks to construct multistory dwellings, or pueblos. The Lower Cliff Dwelling consisted of sixteen rooms on the ground floor, three having a second story. Adjacent to the primary structure was a twelve-room annex. The Upper Cliff Dwelling consisted of thirty-two rooms on the ground floor, eight of which had second stories.

== Material culture (artifacts) ==
Archaeologists have found a variety of objects that form our picture of Salado life and culture. Salado Polychrome pottery was both useful and decorative. Sandals woven from yucca and agave fibers testify to weaving skills, as do close-coiled baskets. Bone tools helped the Salado function and thrive in the desert environment. Corn and cotton were cultivated with ever more extensive irrigation systems. A major technological achievement was the casting of copper bells in wax molds.

== Natural environment ==
The Salt River flows through the Tonto Basin, which provided the Salado with enough water to support agriculture and animal populations. In approximately 1330, climate change made the valley more arid and water tables dropped. Current flora and fauna in the basin and up into the surrounding hills and mountains include mesquite, Arizona walnut, and sycamore trees; saguaro, Cylindropuntia (cholla), prickly pear, agave, and jojoba cactus and succulents; oak, juniper, piñon, and ponderosa pine trees; and deer, rabbit, quail, and other such wildlife.

== See also ==
- Oasisamerica
- Besh-Ba-Gowah archaeological site
