= Roosevelt Red Ware =

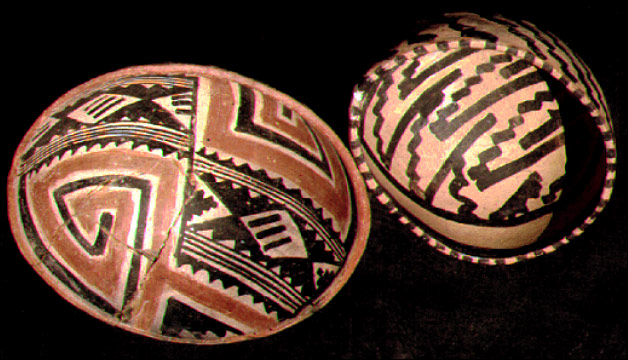
Salado pottery from Tonto National Monument. Left, Tonto Polychrome. Right, Gila Polychrome.

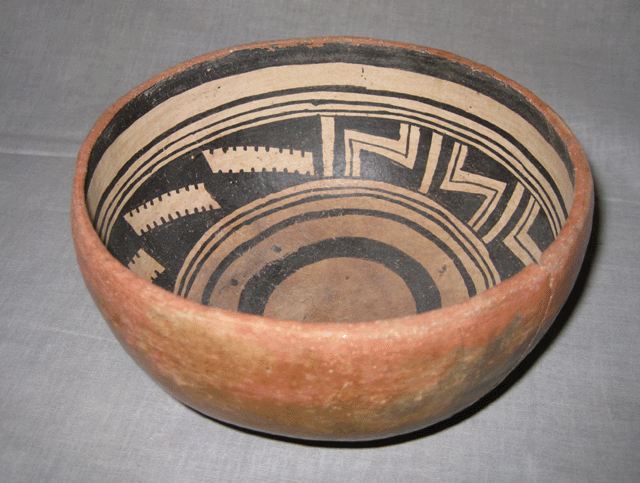
Gila Polychrome Bowl

Roosevelt Red Ware, also known as Salado Red Ware and Salado Polychrome, is a late prehistoric pottery tradition found across large portions of Arizona and New Mexico. The tradition involves the combination of red, white, and black paint in varying configurations along with compositional and morphological characteristics. This ceramic tradition begins about AD 1280-1290 and lasts until at least AD 1450 based on tree-ring dating.

== History ==
Archaeologists have argued over the nature of Salado as a cultural phenomenon or an ideological one spreading through the Southwest. Some archaeologists have chosen to use the term Salado Polychromes so as not to give undue emphasis to the Roosevelt Lake area, once thought to be the center of production. Both terms, Salado Red Ware and Roosevelt Red Ware are still used by archaeologists.

In her 1994 volume, Dr. Patricia Crown tested four existing models for understanding the Salado Polychromes: "elite symbols of authority or items of exchange," "indicators of participation in an economic alliance/regional system," "objects associated with the spread of a religious ideology," or "markers of ethnicity for a migrant group" (Crown 1994: vi). She concluded that they initially appeared in villages with migrant groups from northeastern Arizona, spreading in association with a regional religious movement that promoted peaceful movement of goods, people, and ideas across cultural boundaries (rather than a movement based on ancestor worship or other beliefs). More recently archaeologists have examined these types distribution across the Southwest (Lyons 2003) and suggests that these types are markers of migrant groups emanating from northeastern Arizona.

== Ceramic typology ==
Roosevelt Red Ware is divided by archaeologists into a series of types, which cover shorter spans of time, based on configurations of the painted designs and rim profiles of bowls. Roosevelt Red Ware has traditionally been organized into three types based on stylistic differences. More recently researchers at Archaeology Southwest (previously named the Center for Desert Archaeology) in Tucson, Arizona have identified an additional six types based on a combination of stylistic and morphological characteristics. For bowls with both interior and exterior decoration, the exterior style is labeled as the variant (Example: Gila interior with a Tonto exterior would be labeled as Gila Polychrome: Tonto Variant)

All types within this ware share a number of broad categorical similarities although over a roughly 250 year time span significant variation is seen. The paste is generally brown to reddish-brown in color and is tempered with sand. Generally red and/or white slip cover both the interior and exterior and black paint is used on one or both surfaces, usually surrounded by white rather than red slip. Black paint is most commonly organic, but a mixture of organic and mineral paint appears on some vessels. Petrographic analyses have shown that Roosevelt Red Ware is produced across the full distributional range.

=== Pinto Polychrome ===
Pinto Polychrome is the earliest of the Roosevelt Red Wares and dates from AD 1280 to 1330. Pinto Polychrome vessels are only found in the form of bowls and lack the banding line, also called a "life-line" by some authors, that identify Gila Polychrome. Stylistically Pinto Polychrome is reminiscent of St Johns Polychrome in its layout of opposed hatched and solid elements, although the type exhibits a period of experimentation with colors and layouts that continue through subsequent types.

Pinto polychrome is found along the Mogollon Rim in Arizona as well as the Tonto Basin, Sierra Ancha, Globe Highlands, San Pedro Valley, Point of Pines Area, Kinishba Area and the Upper Gila Valley (Neuzil and Lyons 2005: 34).

There is a transitional variant that has been noted by some authors known as Pinto-Gila Polychrome. This type exhibits the more bold designs generally found in Gila Polychrome but lacks the banding line and is still only found in bowls. Some authors have chosen not to use this type arguing that types tend to blur in transitional periods between types and that adding types adds no additional analytical usefulness. Pinto Polychrome is also contains a Salmon Variety (see Gila Polychrome).

=== Pinto Black-on-red ===
Similar in dates, designs, and geographic distribution to Pinto Polychrome but without the white slip underlying black paint.

=== Gila Polychrome ===
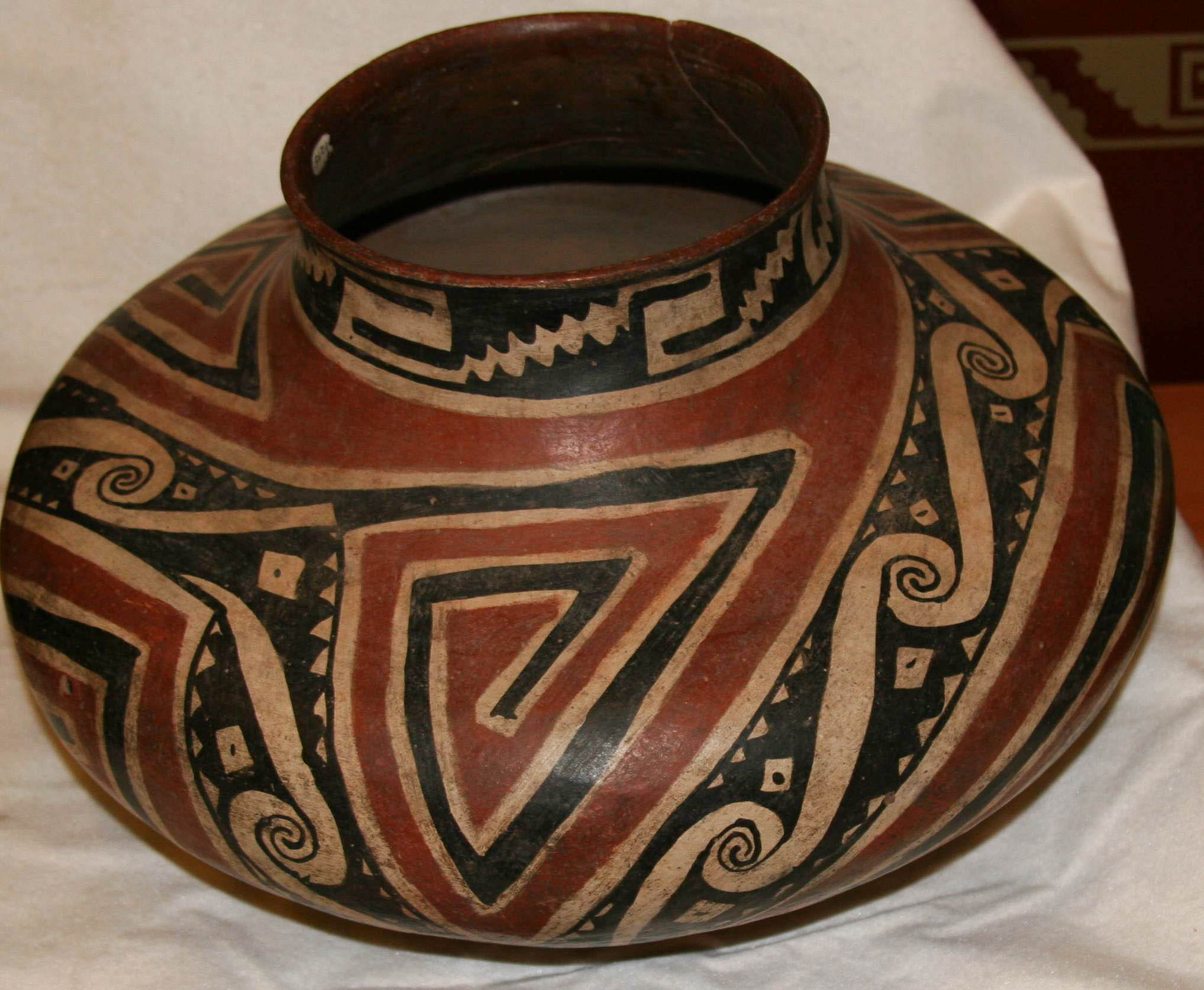
Tonto Polychrome jar (olla), Tonto National Monument

Gila Polychrome is the first type in this series to be found in both bowls and jars. Stylistically Gila Polychrome is identified by bolder motifs than Pinto Polychrome and bowls are most readily identified by the banding line just below the interior rim. Jars have broad stripes of white slip with black designs, although the bases are usually still slipped red. Sometimes jars exhibit multiple parallel bands of black on white decoration separated by thin bands of red slip. Gila Polychrome, Salmon Variety, replaces the usual white slip with a pinkish slip but otherwise remains stylistically similar (Neuzil and Lyons 2005: 21-22).

Gila Polychrome is produced from about AD 1300-1450 across Arizona, New Mexico and northern Mexico, north of Casas Grandes, Chihuahua.

=== Gila Black-on-red ===
Similar in dates, designs and geographic distribution to Gila Polychrome but without the white slip underlying black paint.

=== Tonto Polychrome ===
Tonto Polychrome is found in higher frequencies on jars. The black on white designs are generally narrower bands than on Gila jars, or panels of decoration, and are surrounded by red slip. This type has a later starting date than Gila Polychrome, AD 1340 and an end date of 1450.

=== Cliff Polychrome ===
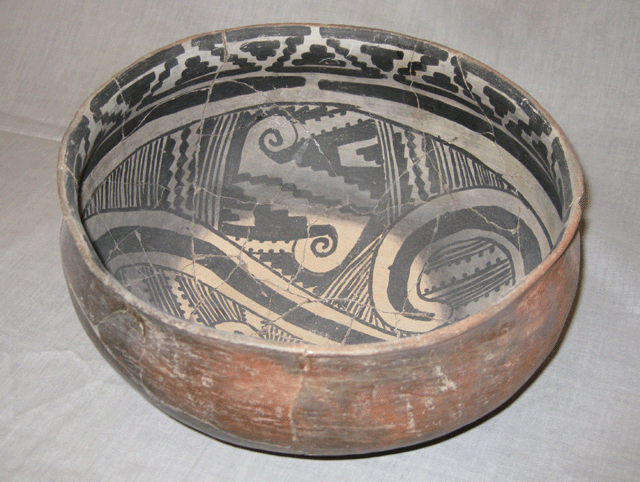
Cliff Polychrome Bowl

Cliff Polychrome is identified by stylistic and morphological characteristics that distinguish it from Gila Polychrome. Dates given for this type range from AD 1300-1450 (Lyons 2004).

This type is found in bowl form and can be partially identified by recurved and semi-flaring rims. Accompanying the shift in bowl shape is a drop in the banding line, creating a secondary design field between the banding line and the rim. Design elements otherwise are similar to those found on Gila and Tonto Polychrome vessels.

Lyons (2004) describes the spatial distribution for this type as ranging from Petrified National Forest, Arizona to Casas Grandes, Chihuahua, Mexico and from the Phoenix basin to Alamogordo, New Mexico. The locus of heaviest production for this type seems to be centered around southeastern Arizona and southwestern New Mexico possibly indicating the location of origin for this type. Temporal distribution would seem to indicate that this type is temporally significant since sites exist throughout the distributional range containing both Gila and Tonto Polychrome, but lacking Cliff Polychrome.

=== Nine Mile Polychrome ===
Nine Mile Polychrome is similar to Cliff Polychrome in that it only occurs in bowls with a recurved rim with a black-on-white band of design on the bowl interior just below the rim, the area above the banding line on Cliff Polychrome. Unlike Cliff Polychrome however, the rest of the interior of this type is red slipped without any additional elaboration, including lack of a banding line. Generally Nine Mile Polychrome vessels have either a Gila or Tonto Polychrome exterior decoration. This type is found in the region from the Cliff Valley to Perry Mesa, and from the Middle Verde Valley to the area around Douglas, Arizona. While rare, this type seems to have its greatest density around the far southeastern portion of its distribution. This type dates from the timer period AD 1375-1450 (Neuzil and Lyons 2005).

This type is named for the Nine Mile Site in the San Simon Valley excavated by Jack and Vera Mills in the 1940s.

=== Phoenix Polychrome ===
Phoenix Polychrome also occurs only in bowls with recurved rims. This type is similar to Nine Mile Polychrome with the difference being that Phoenix Polychrome lacks the band of black on white decoration on the interior of bowls and is instead entirely covered in red slip. As with other types, the exterior of these bowls may have either Gila or Tonto style decoration.

This type dates to AD 1375-1450 and as the name suggests its distribution centers on the Phoenix basin, but distribution extends east to the Cliff Valley and is extends from the Verde Valley in the north to the Douglas, Arizona area in the south (Neuzil and Lyons 2005).

=== Dinwiddie Polychrome ===
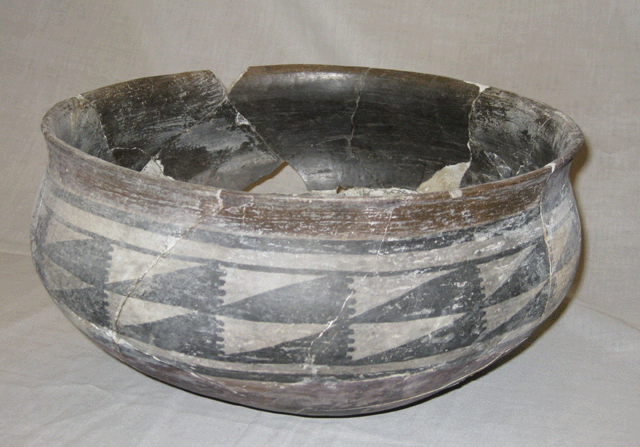
Dinwiddie Polychrome Bowl

Dinwiddie Polychrome is also defined by bowls with recurved rims and dates to AD 1375-1450. Decoration on this type is restricted to the exterior of vessels with the interior being smudged (Neuzil and Lyons 2005).

Dinwiddie Polychrome has a very restricted spatial distribution and may "not occur west of a line drawn through Kinishba, near Whiteriver, and the Nine Mile site, near Bowie [Arizona]" (Neuzil and Lyons 2005: 30). In Crown’s 1994 study, although she did not name this type, she noted that Roosevelt Red Ware bowls exhibiting smudged interiors were confined to a limited geographical range.

=== Los Muertos Polychrome ===
Los Muertos Polchrome has a long and storied history of recognition without formal description. Neuzil and Lyons (2005) note that archaeologists have noted this type as a variation of Gila Polychrome since 1927. Names under which this type has been known include Gila Polychrome with four colors, Las Colinas Polychrome, Perry Mesa Polychrome, Gila style with red, and Gila Polychrome; Trichrome Variety.

This type is identified by red paint used in conjunction with black paint in white design fields. Design layout follows either Gila or Tonto styles and so is referred to with reference to either of these varieties. Distribution of this type is limited to the Verde Valley, the Agua Fria-Perry Mesa area, the Lower Salt River Valley, the Middle Gila, the Santa Cruz Flats, and the Tonto Basin (Neuzil and Lyons 2005: 30-31).

=== Cliff White-on-red ===
Cliff White-on-red is also a recurved bowl form of Roosevelt Red Ware. The interior of the vessel is smudged on the interior and the exteriors exhibit the white-on-red decoration. Cliff White-on-red overlaps in distribution with Dinwiddie Polychrome and thus the range appears to be southwestern New Mexico and southeastern Arizona.

Similar white-on-red types exist in the Southwest, although all show sufficient differences for Cliff White-on-red to hold up as a distinct type. This type is different from Gila White-on-red in that Cliff White-on-red is thinned by scraping rather than paddle-and-anvil, and designs are broader than those found on Gila White-on-red. Unlike Cliff White-on-red, Salado White-on-red is white decoration on a red-slipped obliterated corrugated body. Finally, Tularosa White-on-red is most similar to Cliff White-on-red with a smudged interior and a recurved rim form. The differences are that Tularosa White-on-red has two to four coils around the neck and thinner lines used in the designs. (Neuzil and Lyons 2005)

== Mexican Forms ==
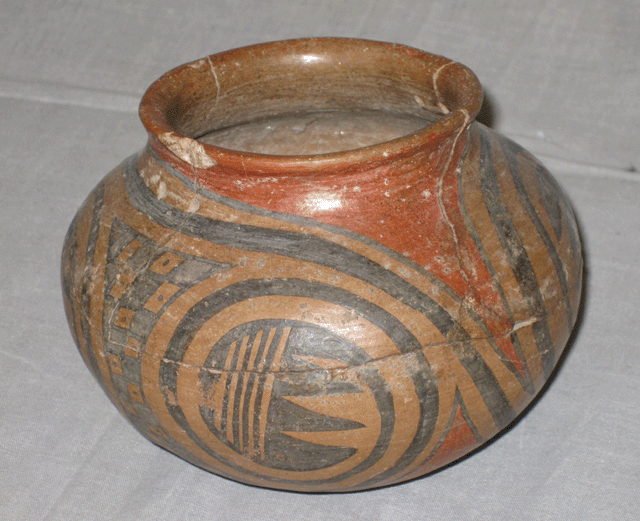
Escondida Polychrome Jar

In their exhaustive study of Casas Grandes, DiPeso, Rinaldo and Fenner (1974), the type Escondida Polychrome was formally named. While not officially a Roosevelt Red Ware, this type exhibits hallmark traits of these types. Escondida Polychrome is produced with locally available clay, a buff firing clay used for types such as Ramos Polychrome, and has black and red designs with many motifs being similar to those found on Roosevelt Red Wares. This type does lack the white slip found on Roosevelt Red Ware, and designs show influence from Chihuahuan types. Escondida Polychrome may be a hybrid type taking aspects of both Roosevelt Red Wares and Chihuahuan wares and being locally produced in northern Mexico.

A second type, unnamed yet, is similar to Escondida Polychrome but exhibits the white slip found on Roosevelt Red Ware. Fenner (personal communication) feels that these vessels are most likely locally produced Roosevelt Red Wares and as such would be found under one of the above headings, although sherds would exhibit the buff-colored paste found in the region.
