= Sierra Ancha Wilderness =

Protected area in Gila County, Arizona

Coordinates: 33°49′18″N 110°52′42″W

The Sierra Ancha Wilderness The Sierra Ancha Wilderness is located about 100 miles east of Phoenix, between Globe and Young. Though fairly small at 32 square miles, it contains some of the most rugged and inaccessible terrain in Arizona. Most of the Sierra Ancha Wilderness lies at an elevation of about 7000 feet. But along the eastern border, is a 20,850 acres (8,440 ha) U.S. wilderness area on the Tonto National Forest in the state of Arizona. The terrain varies from box canyons to high cliffs and pine-covered mountains. Elevations range from lows of about 4,000 feet (1,200 m) to a high of 7,733 feet (2,357 m) at Aztec Peak. It is one of two wilderness areas within the Sierra Ancha mountain range.

Cherry Creek has cut a substantial valley down to an elevation of 3000 to 3500 feet. The four thousand foot elevation change from the mesa top to the river results in a series of vertical-walled canyons cutting back into the mesa towards the west. Within these canyons, virtually any south-facing location with a protective overhang and sufficient building space contains a structure of some kind. Two of the most widely publicized sites—Devil's Canyon ruin and the Pueblo Canyon group.

== History ==
The Sierra Ancha Wilderness Area was first set aside as a "Primitive Area" in 1933, then as a Wilderness Area in 1964.

The ruins of the Sierra Anchas present somewhat of a mystery to archeologists. From 500 to 950 AD the region stood at the boundary between three distinct traditions: the Mogollon to the east, the Hohokam to the west, and the Sinagua to the north. Then about 950 AD a new culture—the Salado—appeared, occupying a region almost 100 miles across with the Sierra Anchas near its center. Tree ring dating of timbers used in construction indicates that the Anchan ruins were built and occupied over a relatively short seventy-year period, from 1280 to 1350, which would make them Salado in origin. However, certain elements of the architecture, tools and pottery show a strong Mogollon influence as well. Adding to the mystery is the fact that the ruins are constructed in extremely inaccessible locations, raising the possibility that defense against invasion was a strong motivation. It has been suggested that this may have been the remnants of an older or hybrid community that managed to cling to its traditions for some time after the surrounding area was occupied by the Salado. At the present time, archeologists simply refer to the inhabitants as the "Anchan Tradition."

== Access ==
The wilderness is accessible through Tonto National Forest via numerous well-marked trails.

== See also ==
- Sierra Ancha Cliff Dwellings
