= Montezuma Castle National Monument =

Ancient dwellings in Yavapai County, Arizona, US

- IUCN category III (natural monument or feature)
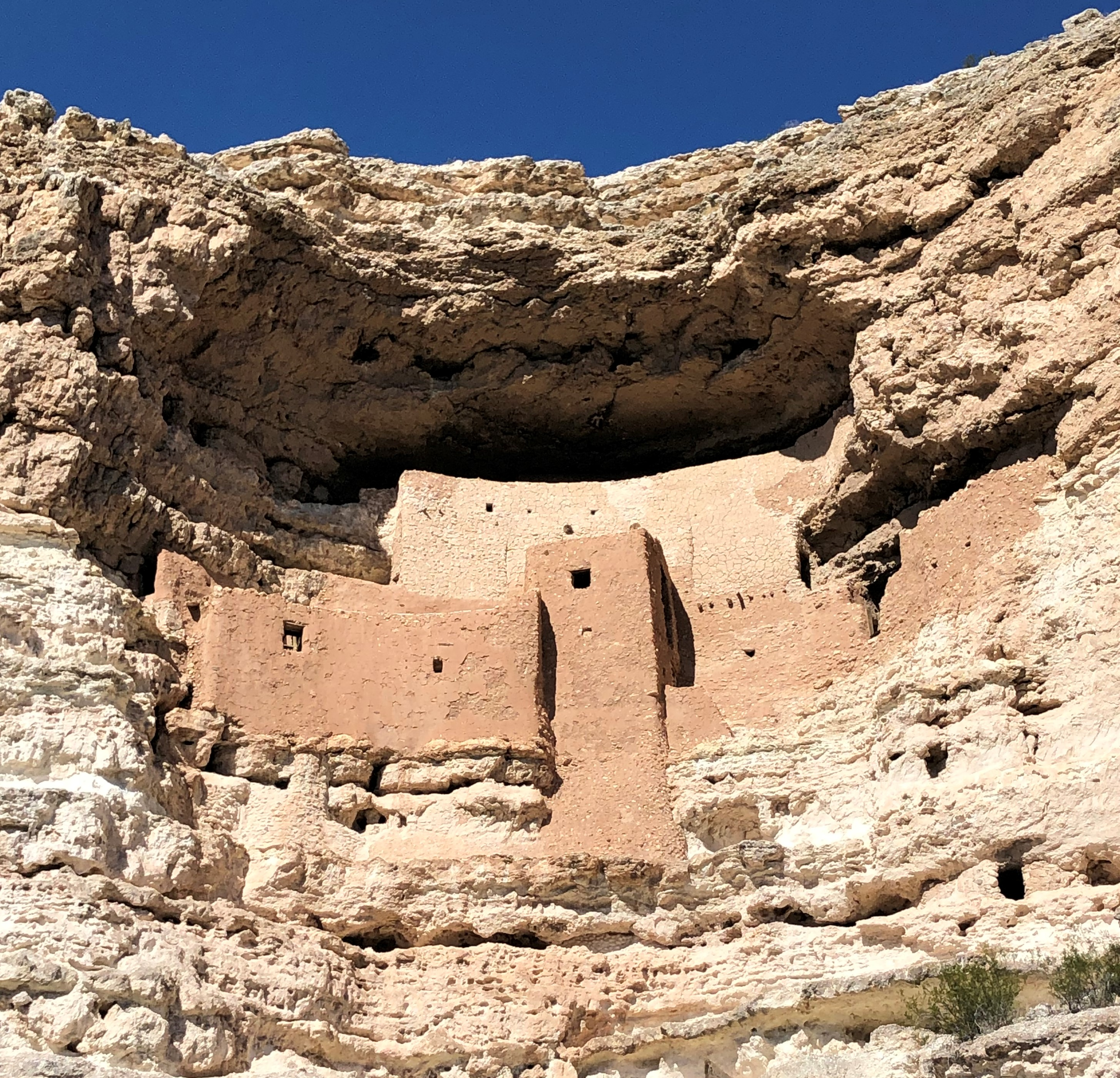
- (2021)

- Location within Arizona Location within the United States
- Interactive map of Montezuma Castle National Monument
- Location: Yavapai County, Arizona, United States
- Nearest city: Camp Verde, Arizona
- Coordinates: 34°36′40″N 111°50′12″W
- Area: 859.27 acres (347.73 ha)
- Created: December 8, 1906
- Visitors: 320,013 (in 2025)
- Governing body: National Park Service
- Website: Montezuma Castle National Monument

U.S. National Register of Historic Places
- Designated: October 15, 1966
- Reference no.: 66000082

Montezuma Castle National Monument protects a well-preserved cliff dwelling located in Camp Verde, Arizona. The National Monument also protects and preserves the Castle A site, a contemporaneous dwelling site located near the cliff dwelling. The construction of the Montezuma Castle and Castle A sites are both attributed to the Southern Sinagua people, a pre-Columbian archaeological culture that may be closely related to several ancestral indigenous peoples of the southwestern United States. Archaeological evidence suggests that the dwelling was constructed as early as 1125 AD and occupied until as late as 1395 AD.

Many Native American communities trace their ancestry to groups of people that lived in or nearby the cliff dwelling. Archaeologists have defined these ancestral groups variously as Southern Sinagua, Hohokam, and Hakataya. Archaeological labels do not constitute tribes as we understand them today and contemporary tribal communities may define their ancestry differently than archaeologists. These communities may oppose popular archaeological labels in favor of native-language terms or culturally specific social units.

== Etymology ==
Neither part of the monument's name is correct. When European-Americans first observed the ruins in the 1860s they named them for the famous Aztec emperor Montezuma in the mistaken belief that he had been connected to their construction (see also Montezuma mythology). Having no connections to the Aztecs, the Montezuma Castle was given that name due to the fact that the public had an image of the Aztecs building many archaeological sites in the American Southwest . In fact, the dwelling was depopulated more than 40 years before Montezuma was born, and was not a "castle" in the traditional sense, but instead may have functioned more like a "prehistoric high rise apartment complex". Many tribal groups throughout the Southwest have specific place names for the cliff dwelling in their respective languages.

== Cliff dwelling ==
Montezuma Castle is situated about 90 feet (27 m) up a sheer limestone cliff, facing the adjacent Beaver Creek, which drains into the perennial Verde River just north of Camp Verde. It is one of the best-preserved cliff dwellings in North America, in part because of its ideal placement in a natural alcove that protects it from exposure to the elements. The precariousness of the dwelling's location and its immense scale of floor space across five stories suggest that the Sinagua were daring builders and skilled engineers. Access into the structure was most likely permitted by a series of portable ladders, which made it difficult for enemies to penetrate the natural defense of the vertical barrier.

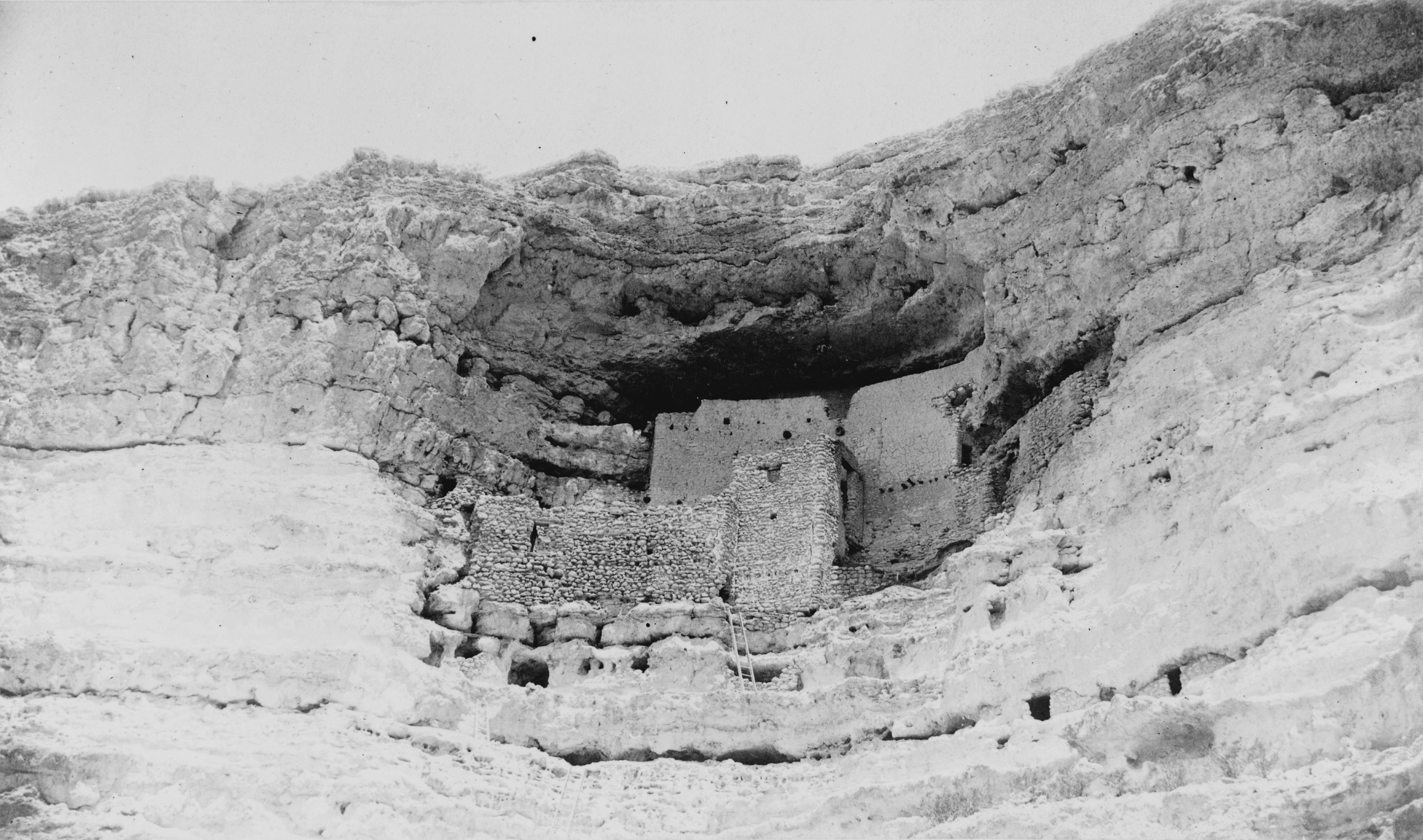
A view of Montezuma Castle from 1887

The walls of Montezuma Castle are examples of stone-and-mortar masonry, constructed almost entirely from chunks of limestone found at the base of the cliff, as well as locally acquired mud mortar. Studies have shown that several different types of mud mortar were especially engineered for specific purposes like durability, strength and color. The ceilings of the rooms also incorporated sectioned timbers as a kind of roof thatching, obtained primarily from the Arizona sycamore, a large hardwood tree native to the Verde Valley. Other wood used for roofing includes Ash, Alder, Ponderosa Pine, Douglas Fir and Pinyon Pine.

== History ==
Evidence of permanent masonry dwellings like those at Montezuma Castle begins to appear in the archaeological record of Arizona's Verde Valley about 1050 AD. Archaeologists recognize the earliest cultural traits of the Southern Sinagua-consisting of a recognizable set of objects and architecture-as early as 700 AD.

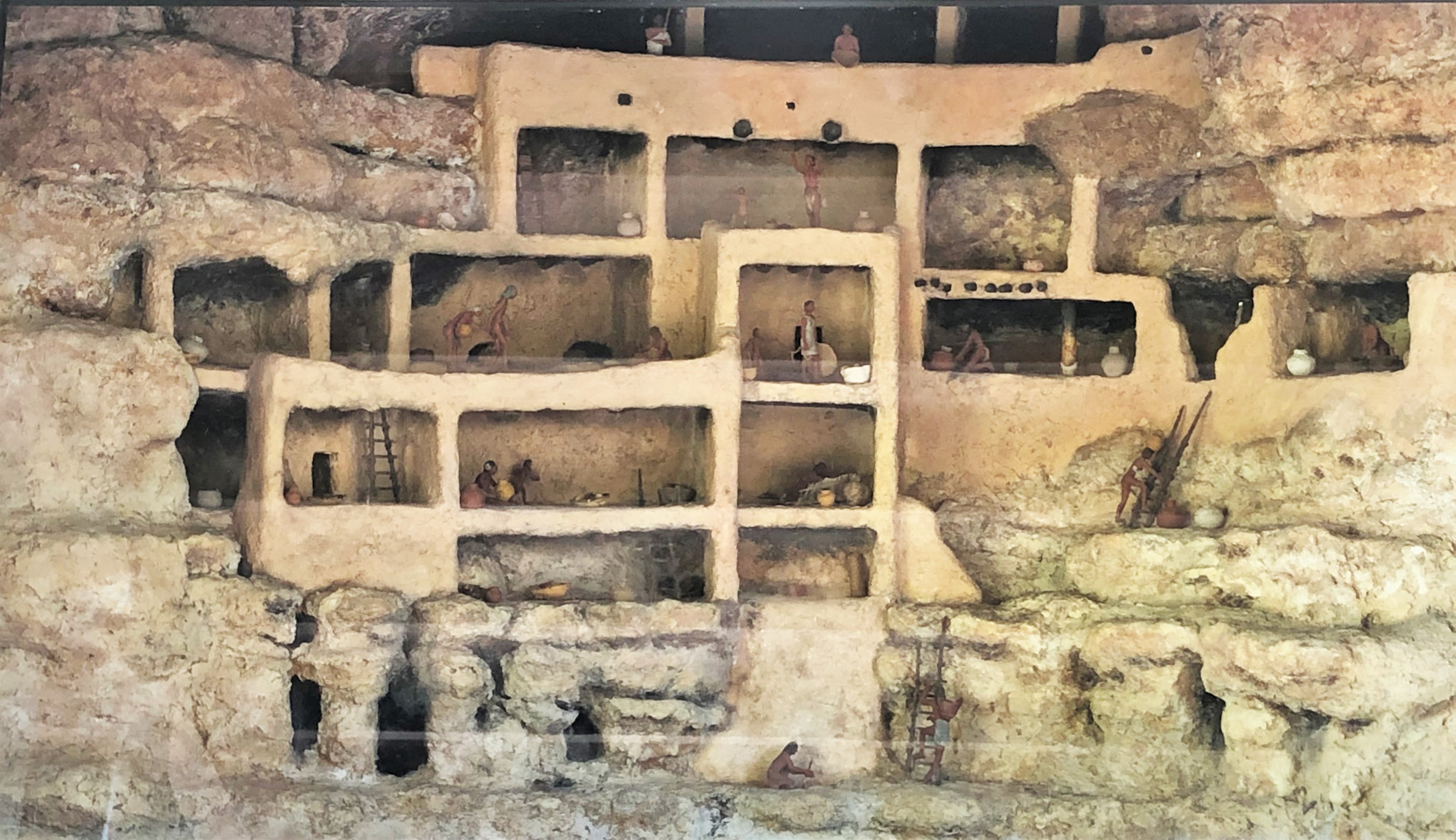
A diorama of what the interior of the castle may have looked like when it was in use

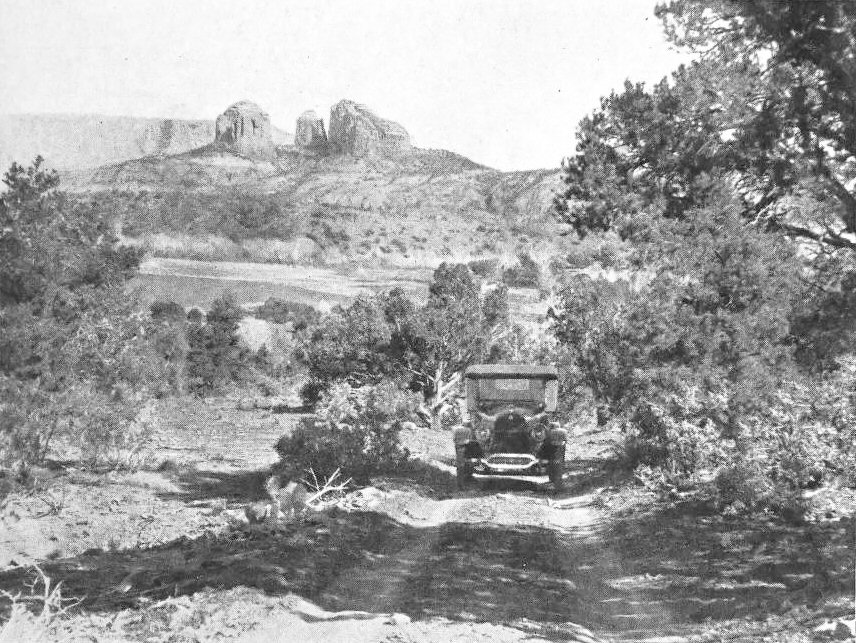
Northern Arizona, Montezuma's Castle, photo by Earl K. Foreman (1924)

The area was briefly depopulated due to the eruption of Sunset Crater Volcano, about 60 miles (97 km) to the north, in the mid-11th century. Although the short-term impact may have been destructive, nutrient-rich sediment deposited by the volcano may have aided more expansive agriculture in later decades. During the interim, the Sinagua lived in the surrounding highlands and sustained themselves on small-scale agriculture dependent on rain. After 1125, the Sinagua resettled the Verde Valley, using the reliable watershed of the Verde River alongside irrigation systems left by previous inhabitants, perhaps including Hohokam peoples, to support more widespread farming.

The region's population likely peaked around 1300 AD, with the Castle housing no more than 30 people in at least 20 rooms. Radiocarbon dates from multiple construction beams at the Montezuma Castle suggest that the cliff dwelling was constructed between 1125 AD to 1173 AD with remodeling and additions in the last decades of the 13th century. A neighboring segment of the same cliff wall suggests there was an even larger dwelling ("Castle A") around the same time. Castle A had an estimated 45 rooms and would have had a large number of inhabitants that contributed greatly to the population of the area. Castle A is in a relatively poor state of preservation with remaining architecture consisting mostly of stone foundations. The site's excavation in 1933 revealed many artifacts and helped archaeologists to develop a more detailed understanding of life in the area. Archaeological evidence and Native American oral histories suggest the Castle A site was destroyed by fire sometime between 1375 AD and 1395 AD and both dwellings were depopulated shortly thereafter.

Many of the large pueblos within the Verde Valley were likely depopulated by 1400 AD This was a time of great demographic and social change throughout the American Southwest. While the reasons for the depopulation at Montezuma Castle are not entirely clear, the Castle A fire along with drought, resource depletion, and conflict are possible explanations. The inhabitants of the Montezuma Castle cliff dwelling did not mysteriously disappear as some people have suggested, instead they moved to different villages. Many tribal communities do not like the term "abandoned" as it suggests that important places, like Montezuma Castle have been forgotten about.

Like many archaeological sites in the area, the cliff dwelling was heavily looted in the late 19th and early 20th centuries. An early account of the site was written by Army Doctor Edgar A. Mearns in an 1890 article in Popular Science Monthly. The article describes the appearance of the site before widespread looting and site damage occurred. Because of the rise in settlers, tourists and the overall popularity of the Montezuma Castle, the monument was under threat until its establishment as a National Monument.

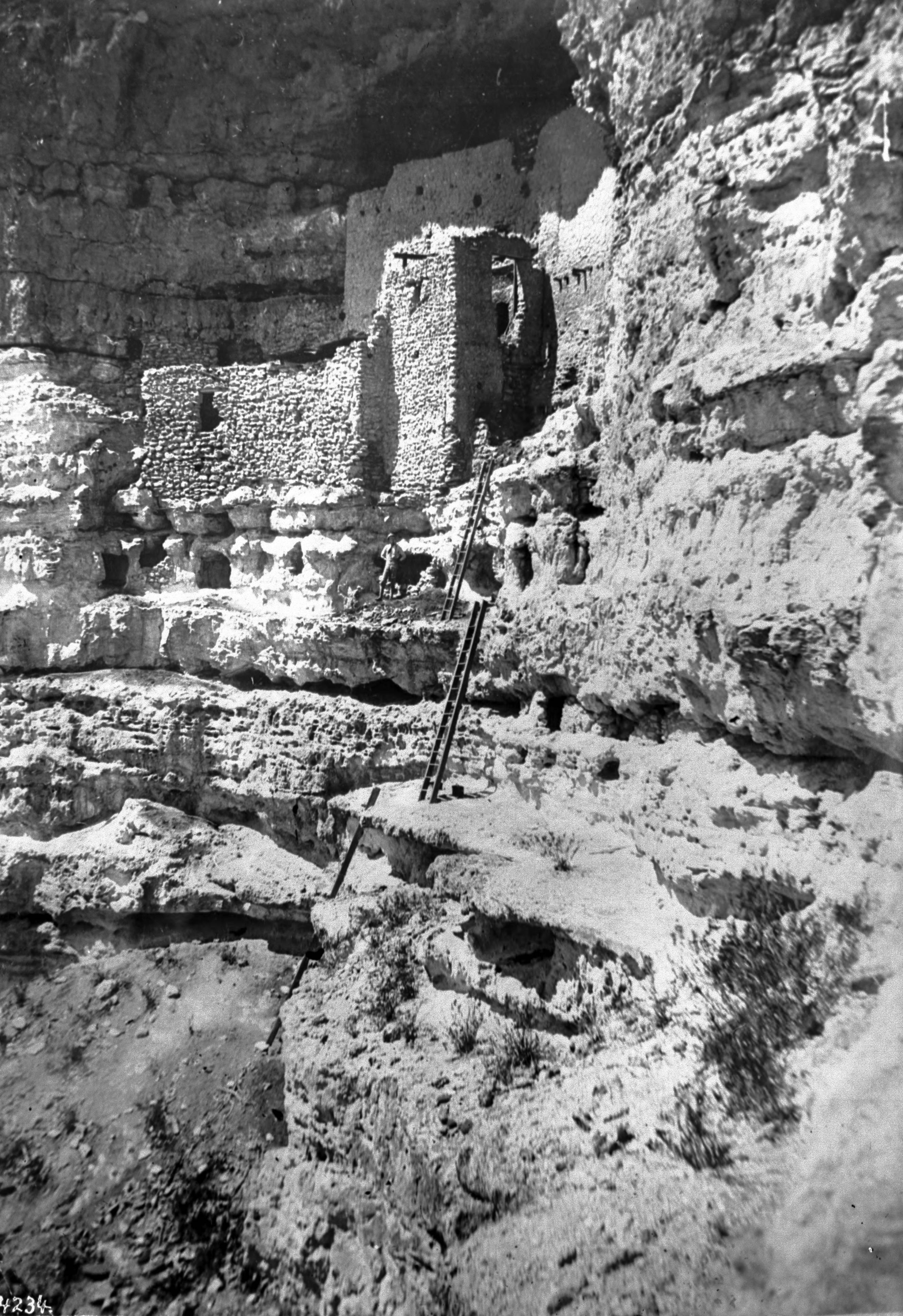
Montezuma Castle c.1893–1900

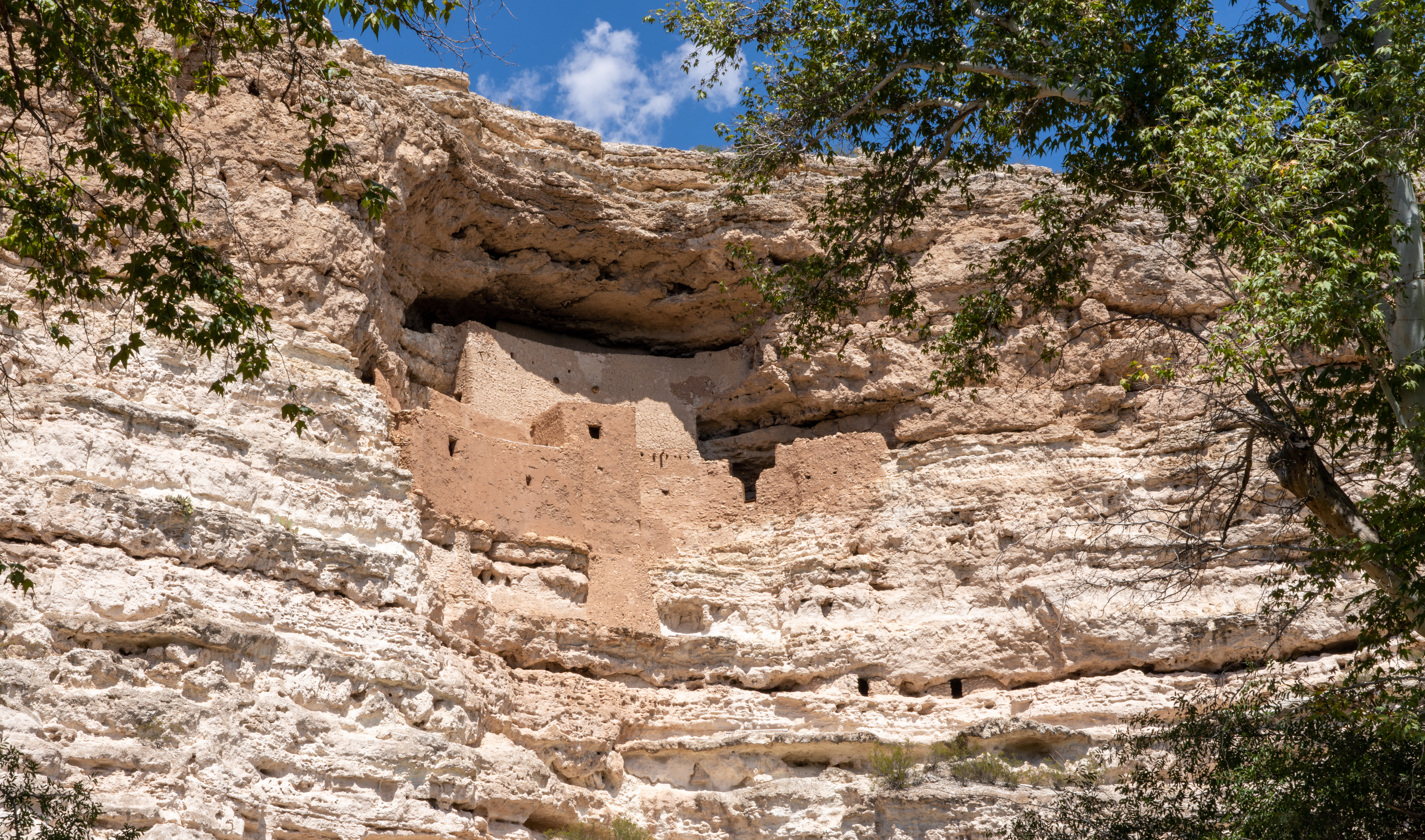
Montezuma Castle National Monument Showing Levels and Main Castle

== Federal protection ==
The monument itself encloses 860 acres near the geographic center of Arizona and the intersection of the Colorado Plateau and Basin and Range physiographic provinces.

The dwellings and the surrounding area were declared a U.S. National Monument on December 8, 1906, as a result of the American Antiquities Act, signed earlier that year. It is one of the four original sites designated as a National Monuments by President Theodore Roosevelt. The establishment of the National Monument was due in large part to the work of archaeologist Edgar Lee Hewett and Iowa Senator John F. Lacey. The National Park Service took over management of the Montezuma Castle National Monument in 1916. Montezuma Castle was added to the National Register of Historic Places on October 15, 1966.

It is an easy monument to visit, just a short distance off Interstate 17, at exit 289. There is a 1/3 mile (0.54 km) paved trail starting at the visitor center that follows the base of the cliff containing the ruins. Access to the interior of the ruins has not been allowed since 1951 due to concerns about visitor safety and damage to the dwelling. About 400,000 tourists visit the site each year. The park is open from 8am to 5pm every day of the year, except for Christmas Day.

The visitor center includes a museum about the archaeology of the monument and the Native American communities that have strong cultural connections to the site. The museum houses many artifacts which display the fine artisanship of the site's inhabitants and suggest they were prolific traders. There is also a Park Store operated by Western National Parks Association.

== Plants and animals ==
Due to the lack of basic knowledge on the natural resources of the national parks, the National Park Service created a program in order to record and identify any changes in the environment and its inhabitants. An inventory of plants and animals at Montezuma Castle was taken between 1991 and 1994 by researchers from Northern Arizona University and the United States Geological Survey. According to the United States Geological Survey, about 784 species were recorded at Montezuma Castle National Monument, including plants, fish, amphibians, reptiles, birds, and mammals. Only 11% of the species were non-native. Common species include bats, snakes, turtles, lizards, frogs, foxes, owls and mice.

== Montezuma Well ==
Montezuma Well, a natural limestone sinkhole, measuring approximately 100 by 120 yards, also containing Sinagua dwellings, was purchased by the federal government in 1947 and is considered a detached unit of Montezuma Castle National Monument. It is located about 5 miles north of the Castle near the town of Rimrock, Arizona, accessible from exits 293 and 298 off Interstate 17.

== Climate ==
Montezuma Castle National Monument has a cold semi-arid climate (Köppen: BSk) with cool winters and very hot summers.

Climate data for Montezuma Castle National Monument, Arizona, 1991–2020 normals, extremes 1938–present
Month	Jan	Feb	Mar	Apr	May	Jun	Jul	Aug	Sep	Oct	Nov	Dec	Year
Record high °F (°C)	82 (28)	89 (32)	96 (36)	99 (37)	109 (43)	117 (47)	117 (47)	118 (48)	111 (44)	104 (40)	90 (32)	78 (26)	118 (48)
Mean maximum °F (°C)	72.0 (22.2)	77.1 (25.1)	85.2 (29.6)	93.2 (34.0)	100.3 (37.9)	108.1 (42.3)	110.5 (43.6)	108.0 (42.2)	102.6 (39.2)	94.8 (34.9)	82.5 (28.1)	71.0 (21.7)	111.6 (44.2)
Mean daily maximum °F (°C)	60.5 (15.8)	64.9 (18.3)	72.0 (22.2)	79.0 (26.1)	87.6 (30.9)	98.1 (36.7)	100.8 (38.2)	98.5 (36.9)	93.0 (33.9)	82.3 (27.9)	69.3 (20.7)	58.6 (14.8)	80.4 (26.9)
Daily mean °F (°C)	43.2 (6.2)	47.1 (8.4)	53.4 (11.9)	59.5 (15.3)	67.5 (19.7)	76.2 (24.6)	82.4 (28.0)	80.7 (27.1)	74.0 (23.3)	62.5 (16.9)	50.4 (10.2)	41.8 (5.4)	61.6 (16.4)
Mean daily minimum °F (°C)	25.9 (−3.4)	29.3 (−1.5)	34.9 (1.6)	40.0 (4.4)	47.3 (8.5)	54.4 (12.4)	64.0 (17.8)	62.8 (17.1)	55.0 (12.8)	42.6 (5.9)	31.5 (−0.3)	25.1 (−3.8)	42.7 (5.9)
Mean minimum °F (°C)	17.2 (−8.2)	20.3 (−6.5)	25.5 (−3.6)	30.3 (−0.9)	36.9 (2.7)	44.2 (6.8)	54.5 (12.5)	54.1 (12.3)	44.7 (7.1)	32.1 (0.1)	20.8 (−6.2)	16.5 (−8.6)	14.3 (−9.8)
Record low °F (°C)	−1 (−18)	4 (−16)	12 (−11)	16 (−9)	24 (−4)	36 (2)	45 (7)	39 (4)	31 (−1)	19 (−7)	8 (−13)	4 (−16)	−1 (−18)
Average precipitation inches (mm)	1.36 (35)	1.28 (33)	1.15 (29)	0.49 (12)	0.40 (10)	0.19 (4.8)	1.52 (39)	2.13 (54)	1.49 (38)	0.95 (24)	0.71 (18)	1.50 (38)	13.17 (335)
Average precipitation days (≥ 0.01 inch)	4.9	4.8	4.3	2.6	2.3	1.0	6.7	7.6	4.4	3.4	3.1	4.4	49.5
Source: NOAA

== In popular culture ==
Montezuma Castle plays a key role in the climax of the Western Flaming Feather (1952), which was shot on location at the site.

== See also ==
- List of national monuments of the United States
- List of the oldest buildings in Arizona
