= Tonto National Monument =

Protected area in Gila County, Arizona

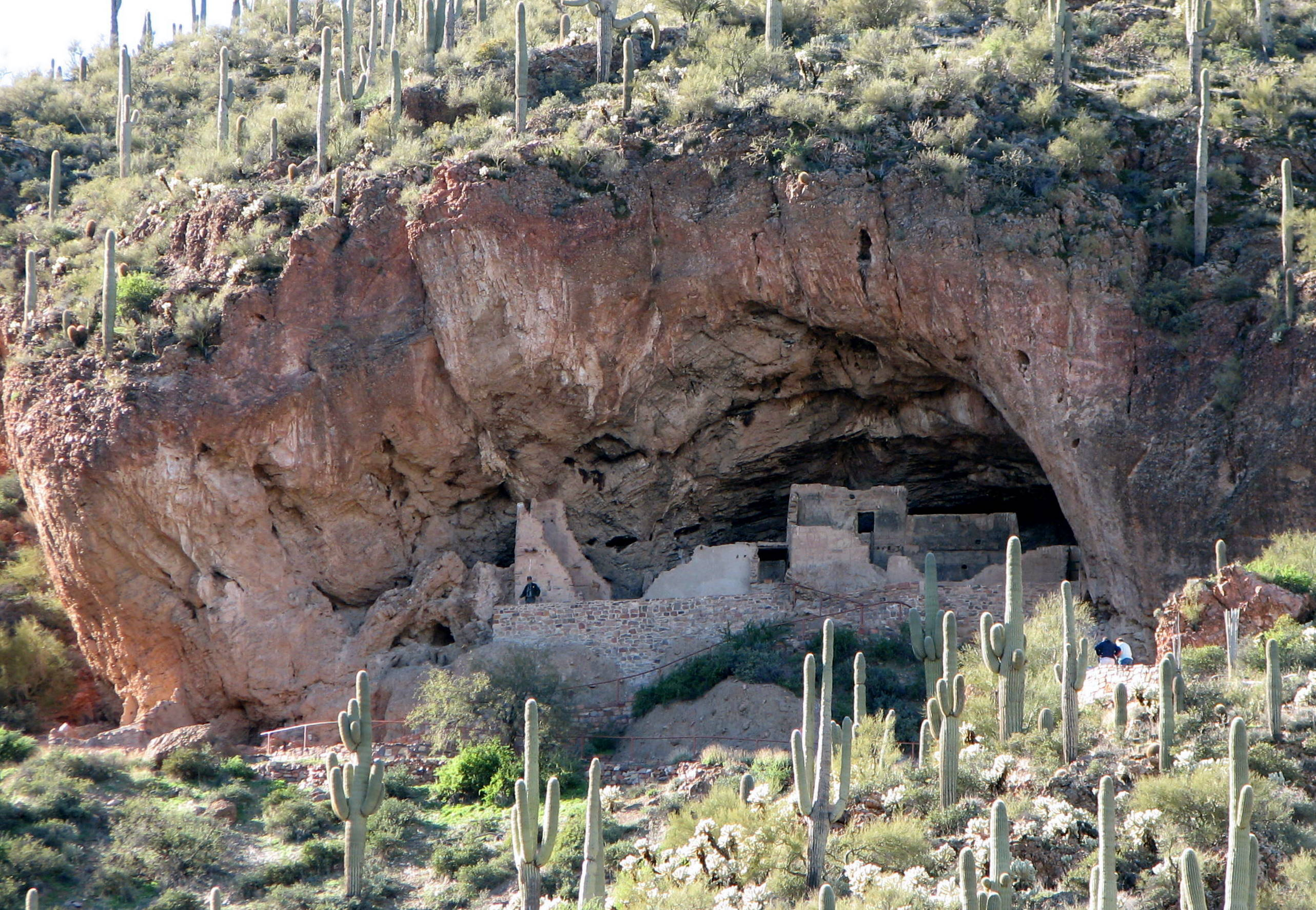
- Lower Cliff Dwelling
- Interactive map of Tonto National Monument
- Location: Gila County, Arizona, USA
- Nearest city: Globe, Arizona
- Coordinates: 33°39′25″N 111°5′40″W
- Area: 1,120 acres (4.5 km^{2})
- Created: December 19, 1907
- Visitors: 31,504 (in 2022)
- Governing body: National Park Service
- Website: Tonto National Monument
- Tonto National Monument Archeological District
- U.S. National Register of Historic Places
- U.S. Historic district
- NRHP reference No.: 66000081
- Added to NRHP: October 15, 1966

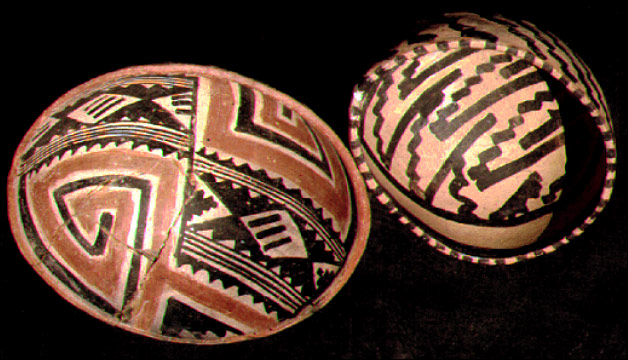
Salado Polychrome pottery from Tonto National Monument

Tonto National Monument is a National Monument in the Superstition Mountains, in Gila County of central Arizona. The area lies on the northeastern edge of the Sonoran Desert ecoregion, an arid habitat with annual rainfall of about 16 inches (400 mm). The Salt River runs through this area, providing a rare, year-round source of water.

== Cliff dwellings ==
Well-preserved cliff dwellings were occupied by the Salado culture during the 13th, 14th, and early 15th centuries. The people farmed in the Salt River Valley and supplemented their diet by hunting and gathering native plants. The Salado were fine craftspeople, producing some of the most flamboyant polychrome pottery and intricately woven textiles to be found in the Southwest. Some of the artifacts excavated nearby are on display in the visitor center museum.

The Tonto National Monument Archeological District was listed on the National Register of Historic Places on October 15, 1966. The Lower Ruin and Upper Ruin are archeological sites that were NRHP-listed in 1989. (Note: All three NRHP-listed areas are included within the National Monument, but the National Monument itself is not NRHP-listed)

== Natural history ==
The National Monument is surrounded by the Tonto National Forest, which includes low plains, desert scrubland, and alpine pine forests.

The Upper Sonoran ecosystem is known for its characteristic saguaro cacti. Other common plants include cholla, prickly pear, hedgehog agave, and barrel cactus (flowering from April to June); yucca, sotol, and agave; creosote bush and ocotillo; palo verde and mesquite trees; an amazing variety of colorful wildflowers in good years (February to March); and a lush riparian area which supports large Arizona Walnut, Arizona Sycamore, and hackberry trees.

It also serves as a home for native animals such as whitetail and mule deer, mountain lion, bobcat, three rattlesnake species, and many more.

=== Wilderness areas ===
The area around Tonto National Monument also includes several designated wilderness areas, including Four Peaks, Superstition, and Salome Wilderness Areas.

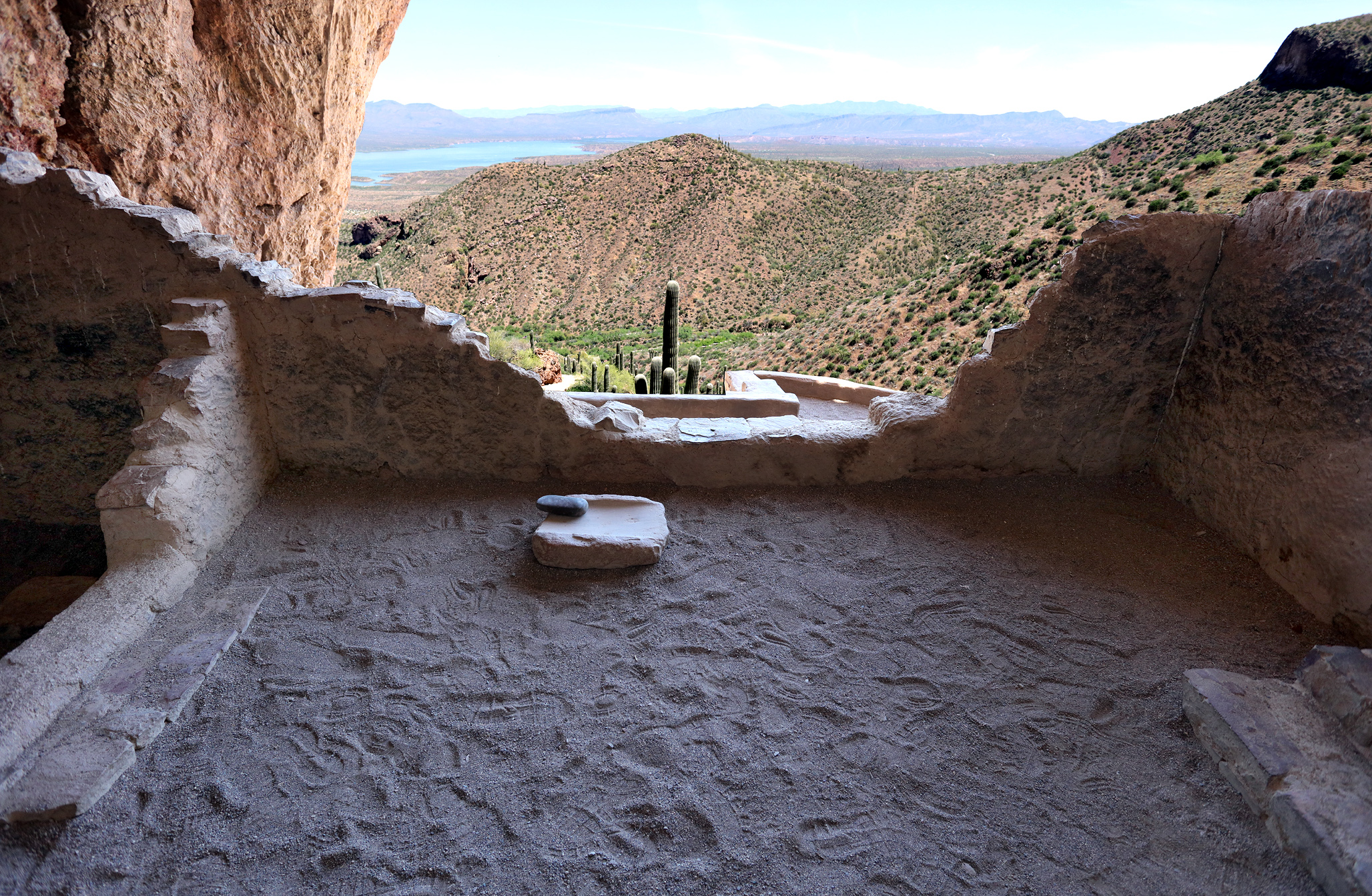
Lower cliff dwelling looking south.

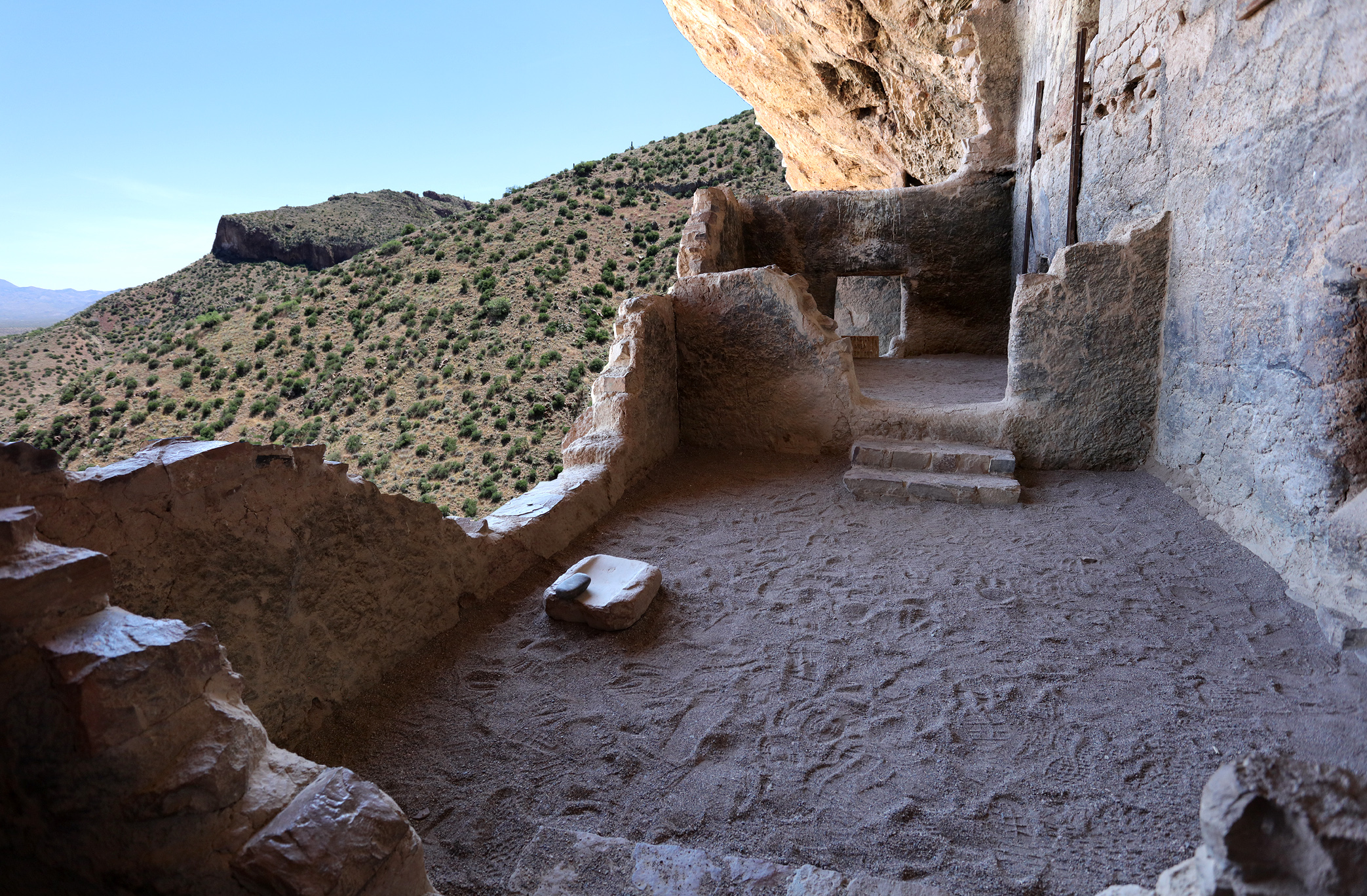
Tonto National Monument looking southwest

== Photo gallery ==
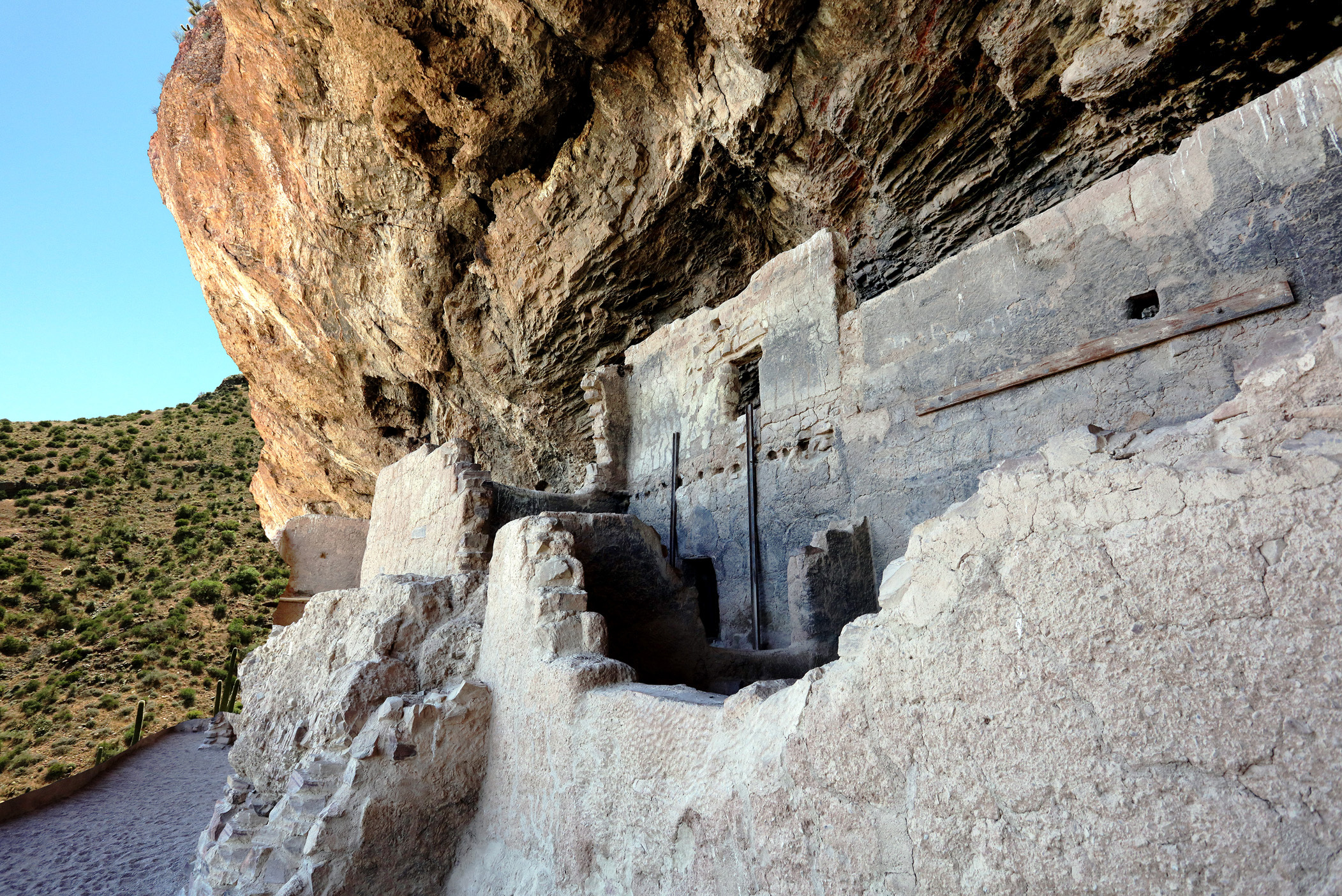
View of Tonto National Monument looking southwest

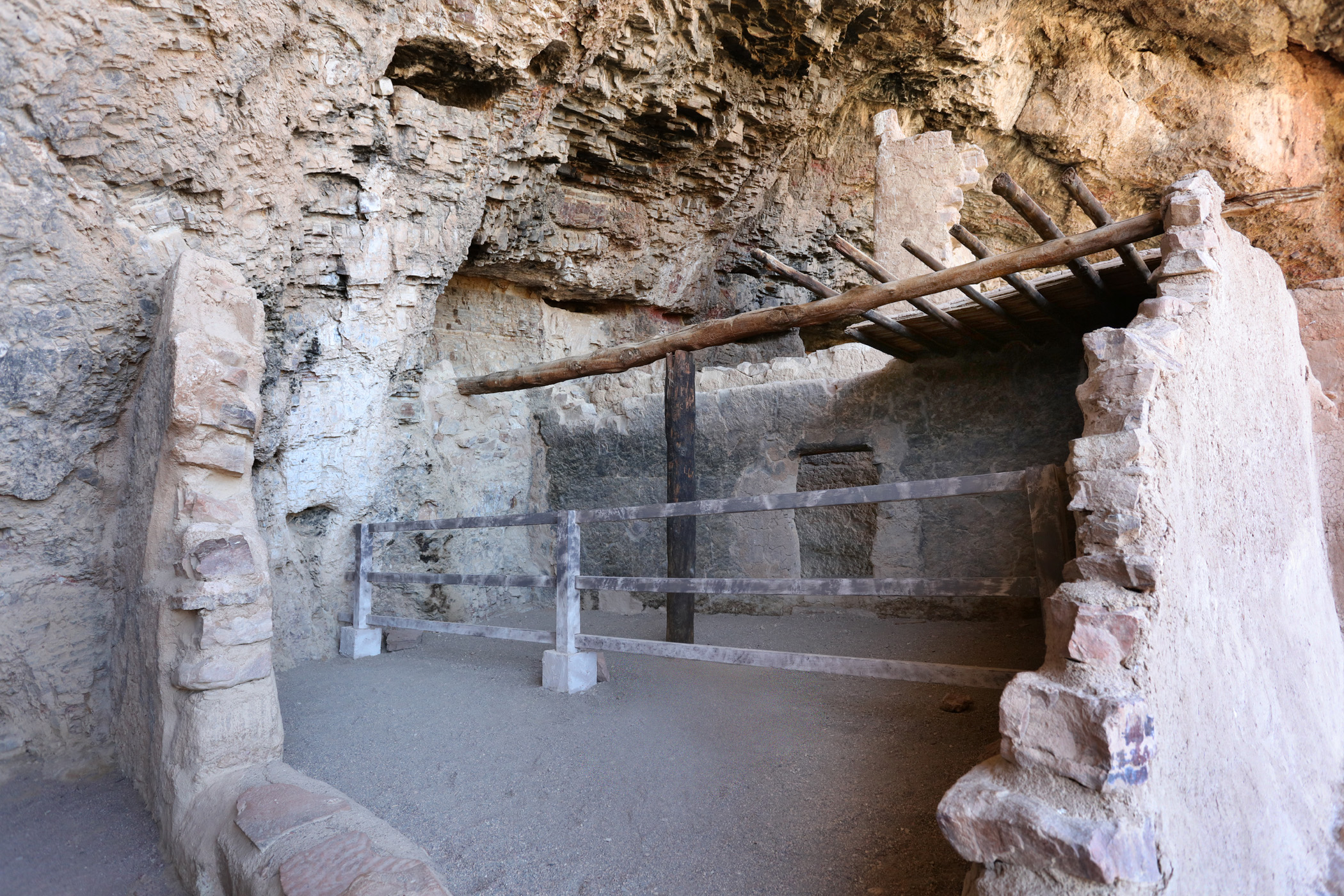
View of Tonto National Monument

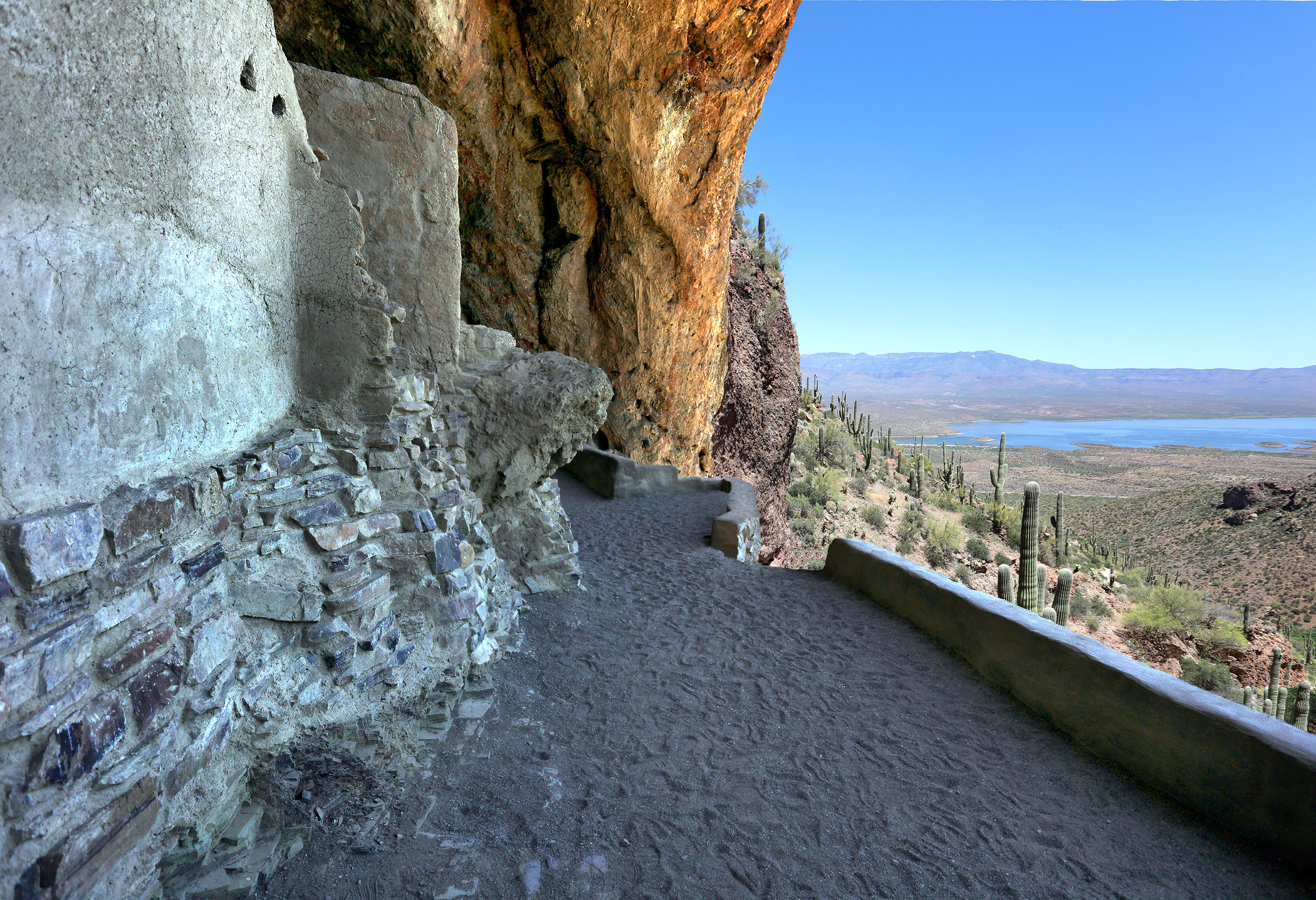
View of Tonto National Monument looking toward Roosevelt Lake

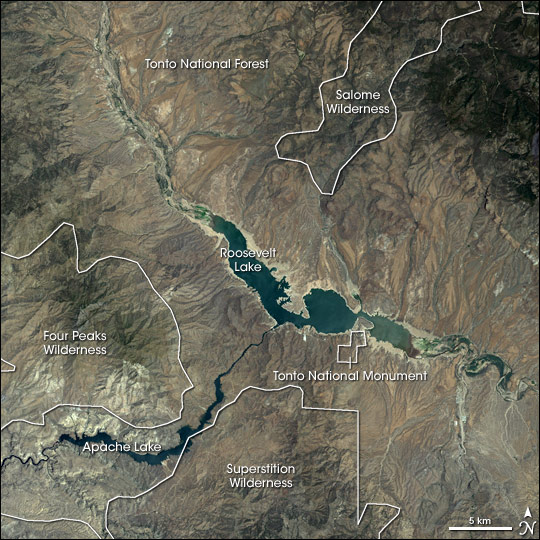
Landsat 7 image of Tonto National Monument (right center), and the surrounding area

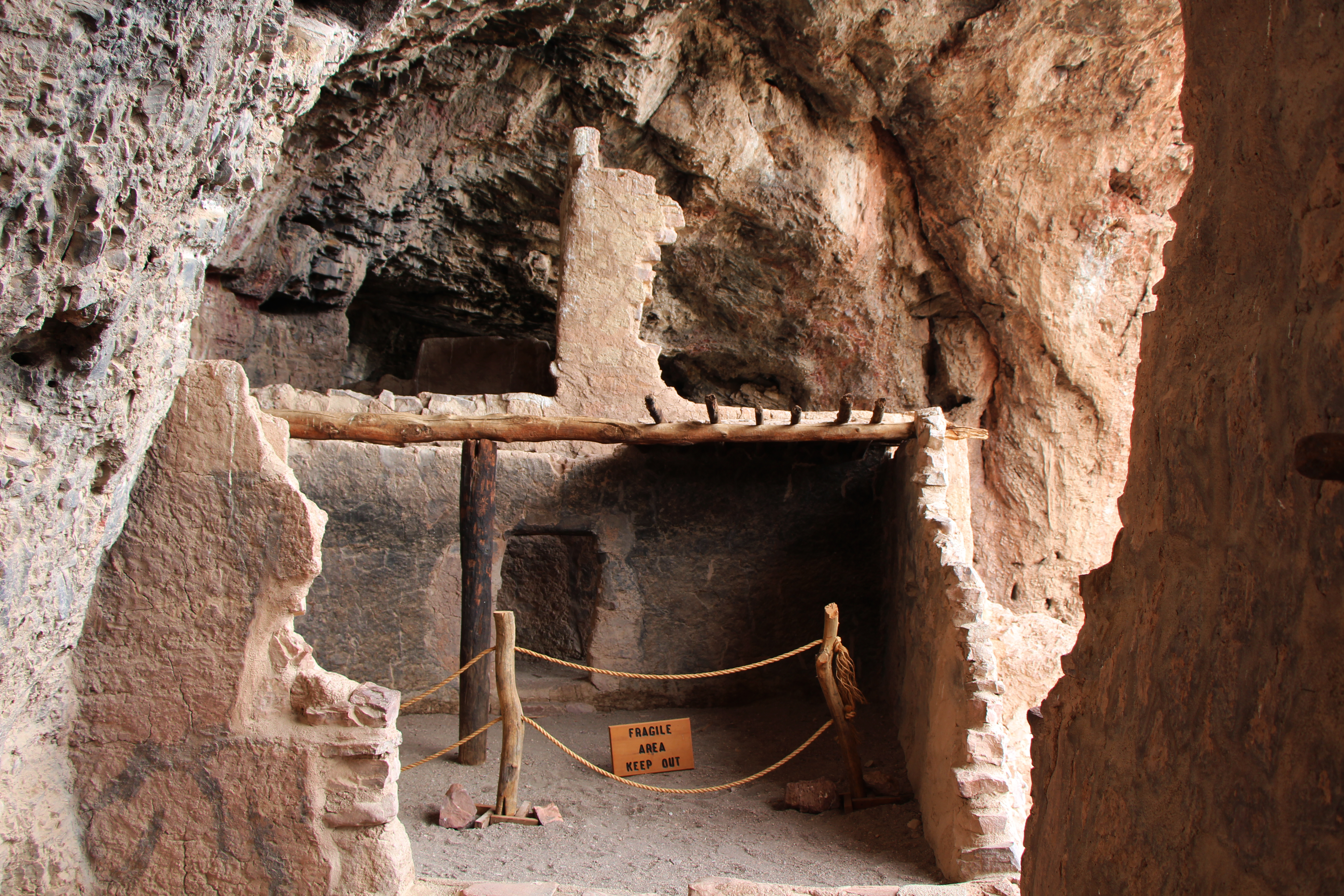
Tonto National Monument, AZ, Room detail

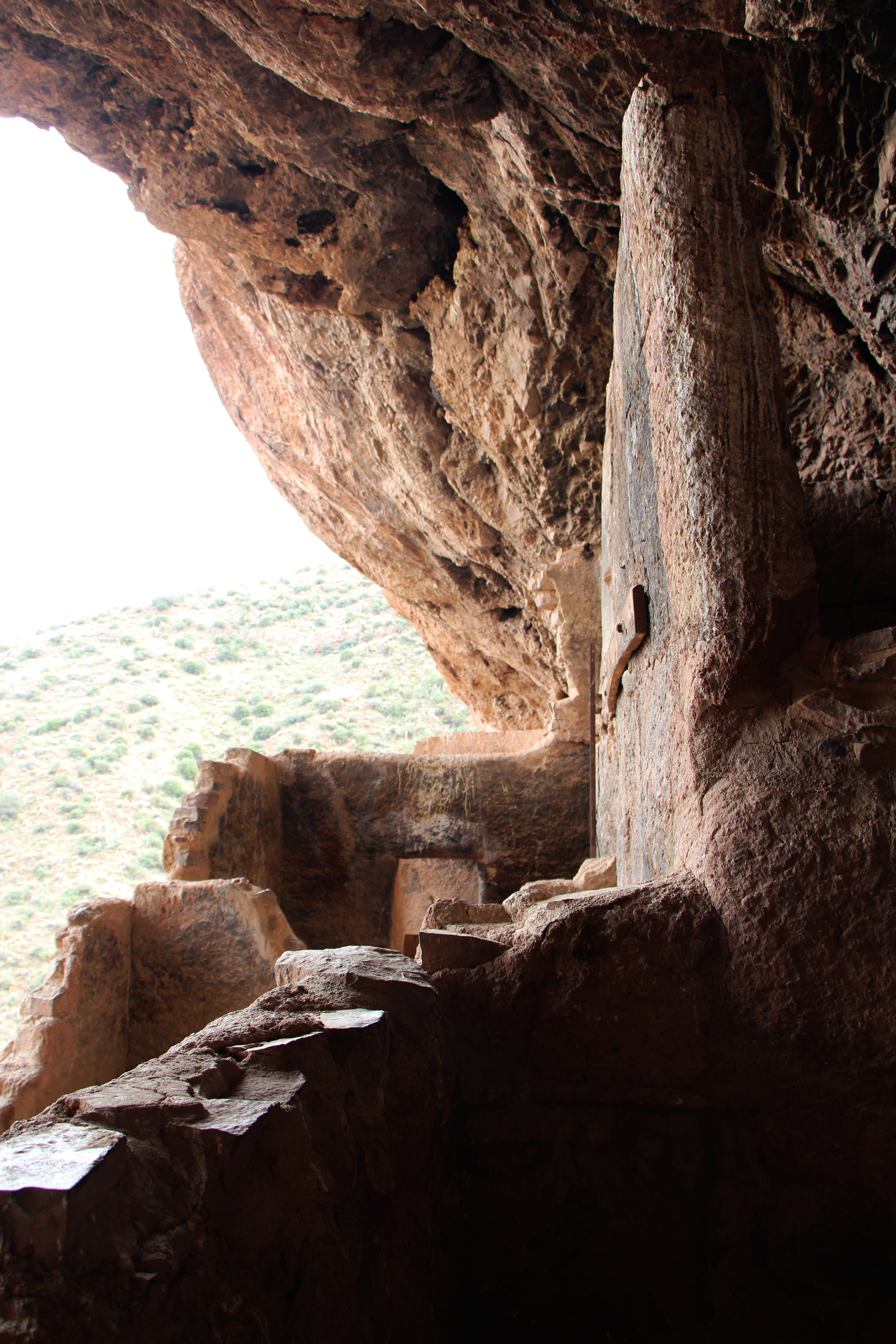
Tonto National Monument, AZ, room detail

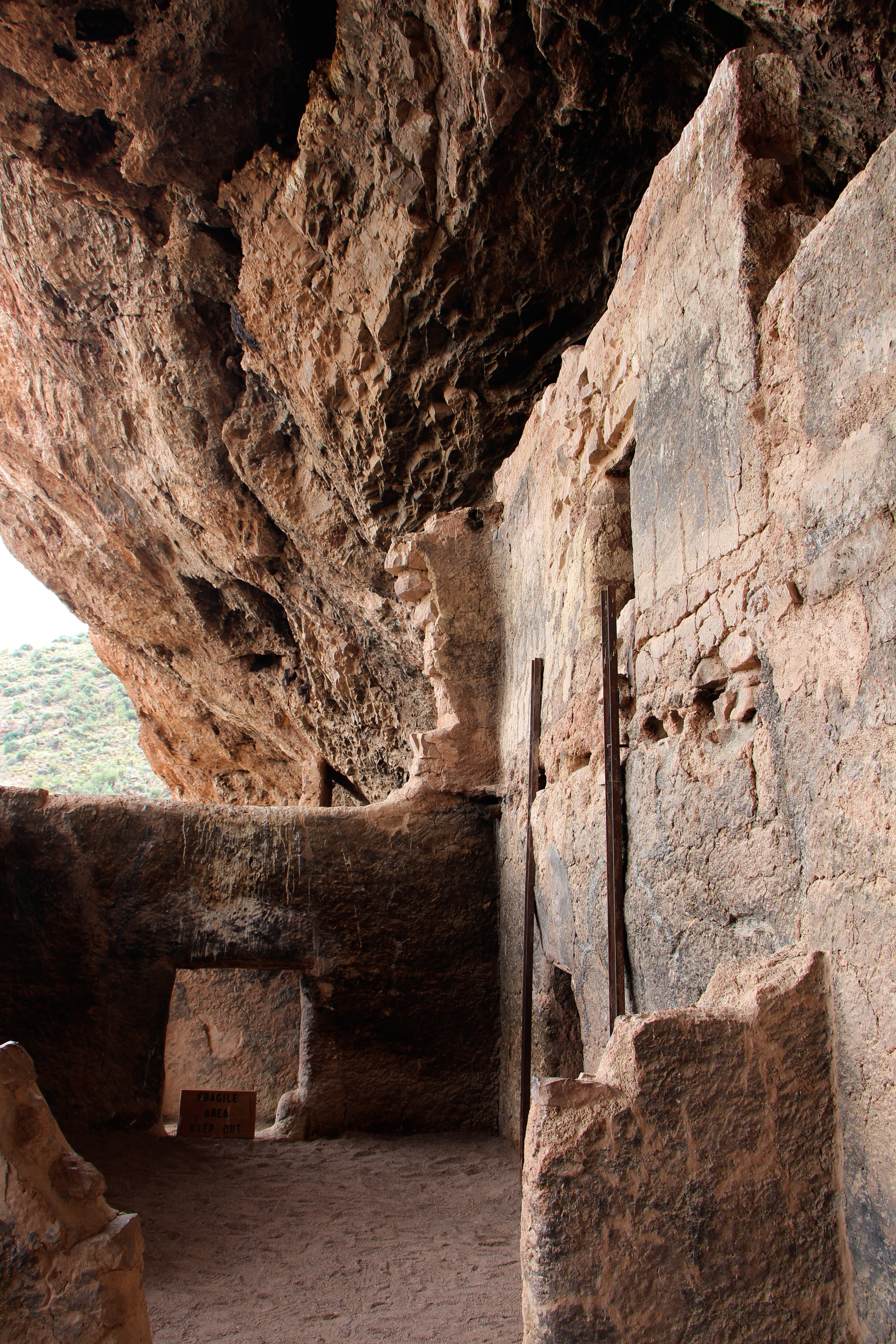
Tonto National Monument, AZ, room detail

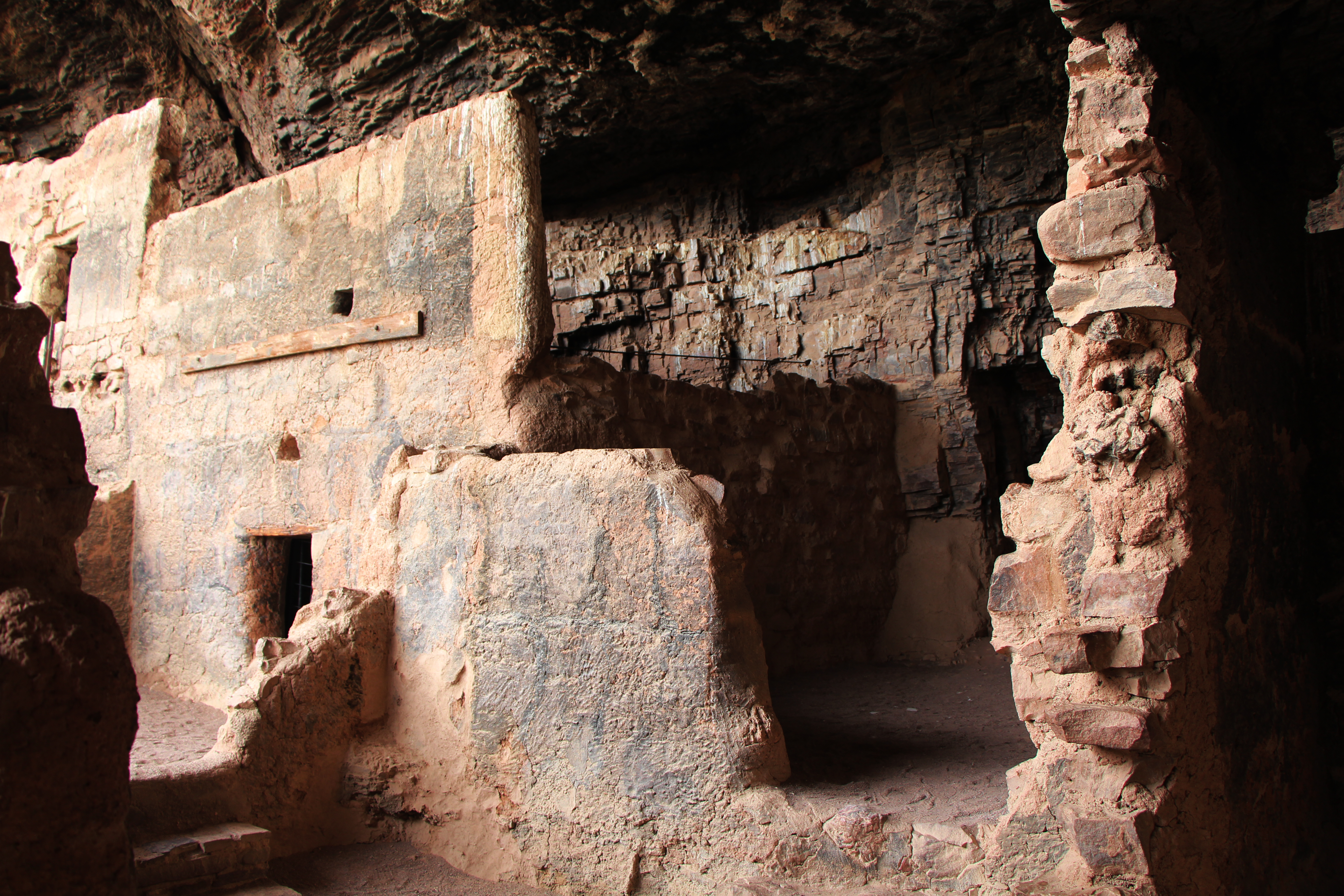
Tonto National Monument, AZ, Room detail

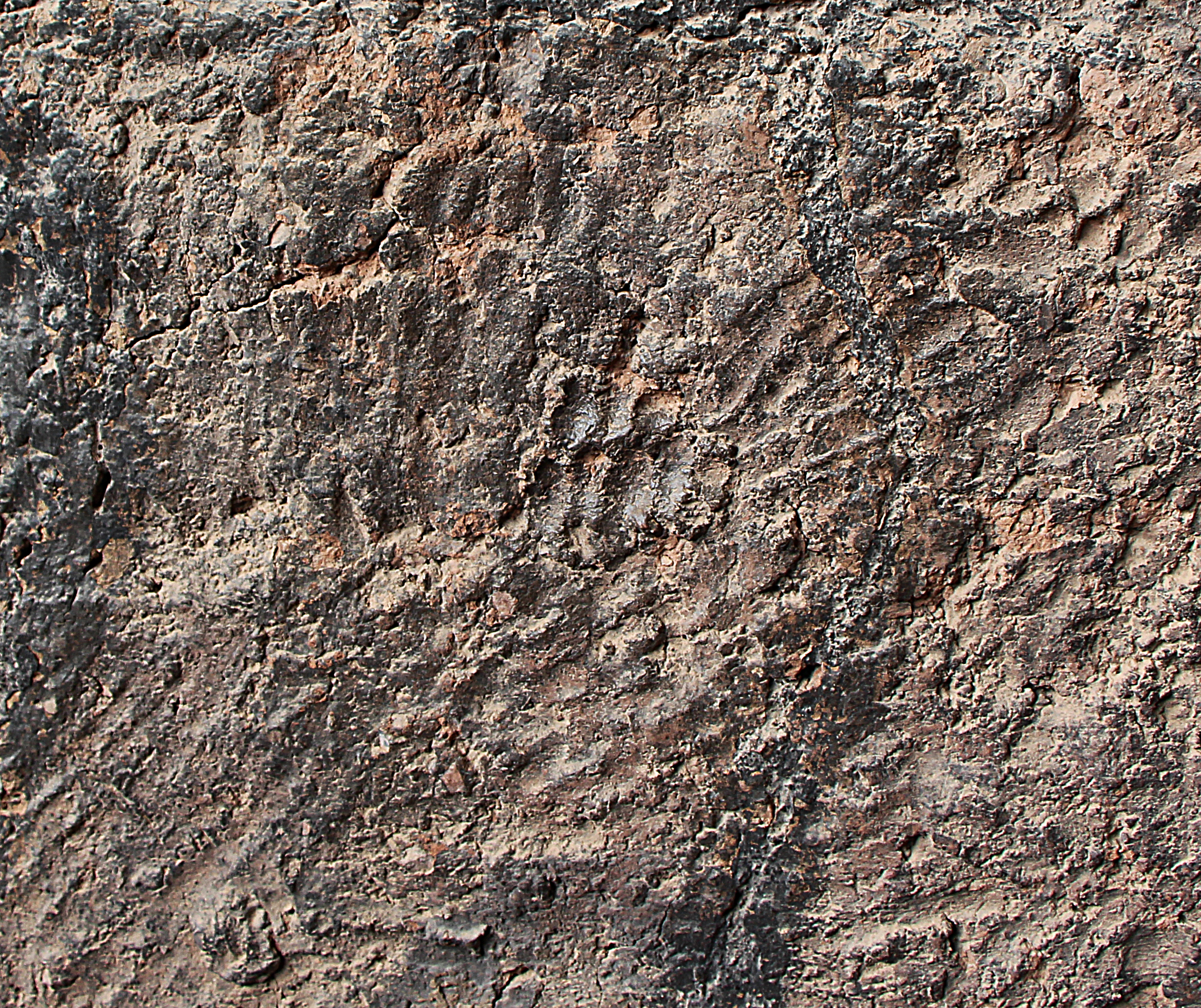
Tonto National Monument, AZ, hand prints on wall

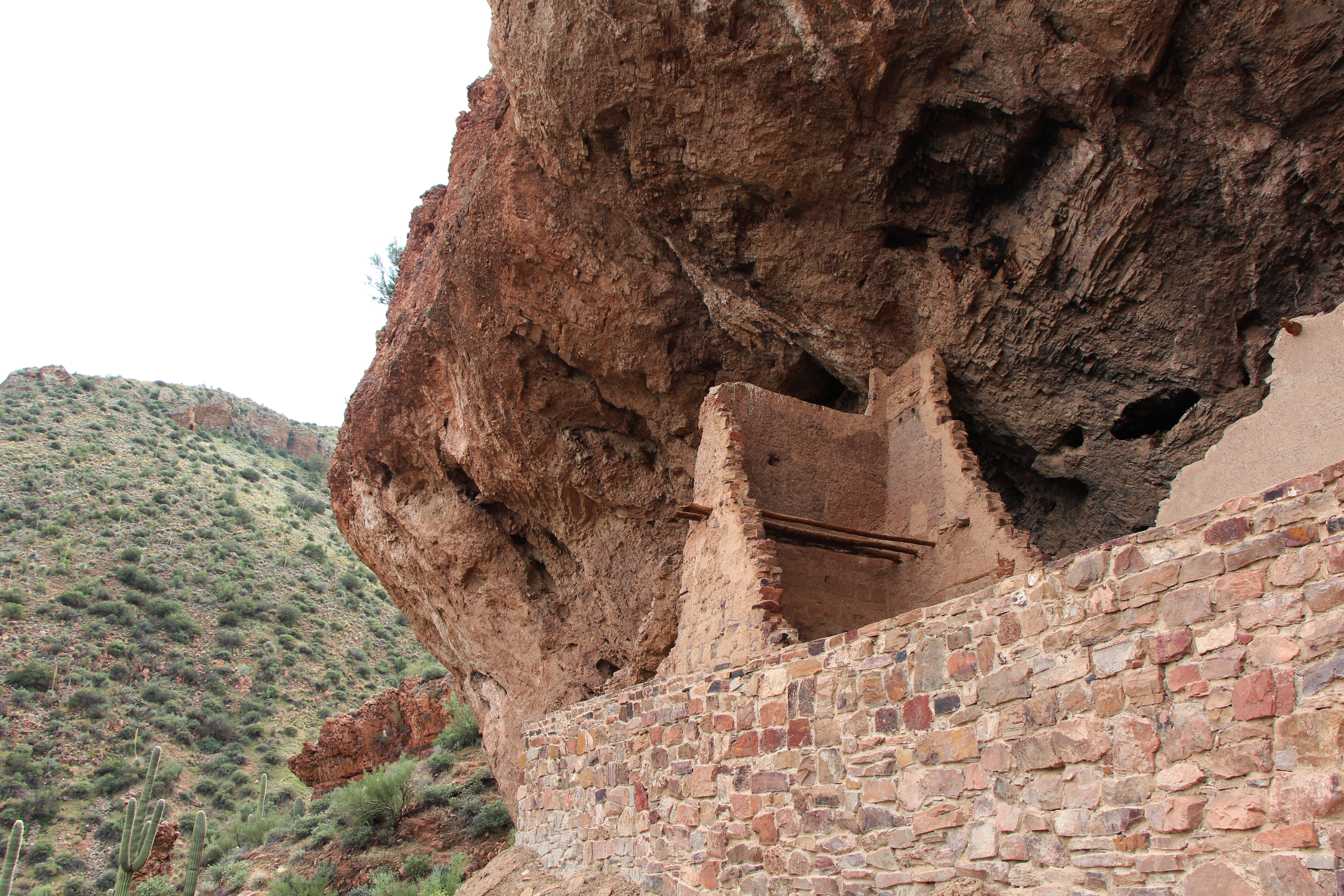
Tonto National Monument, AZ, looking west

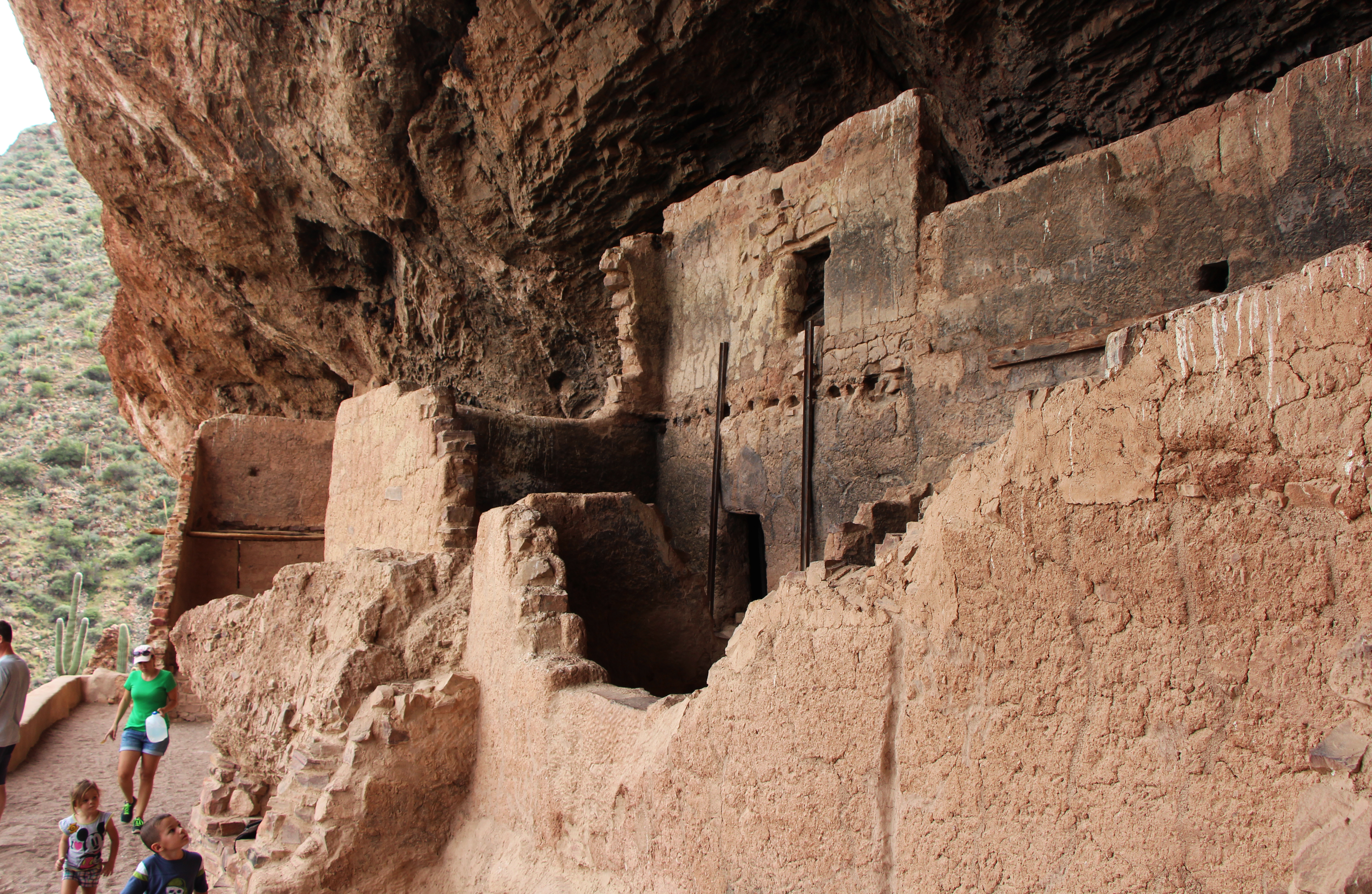
Tonto National Monument, AZ, looking along west face

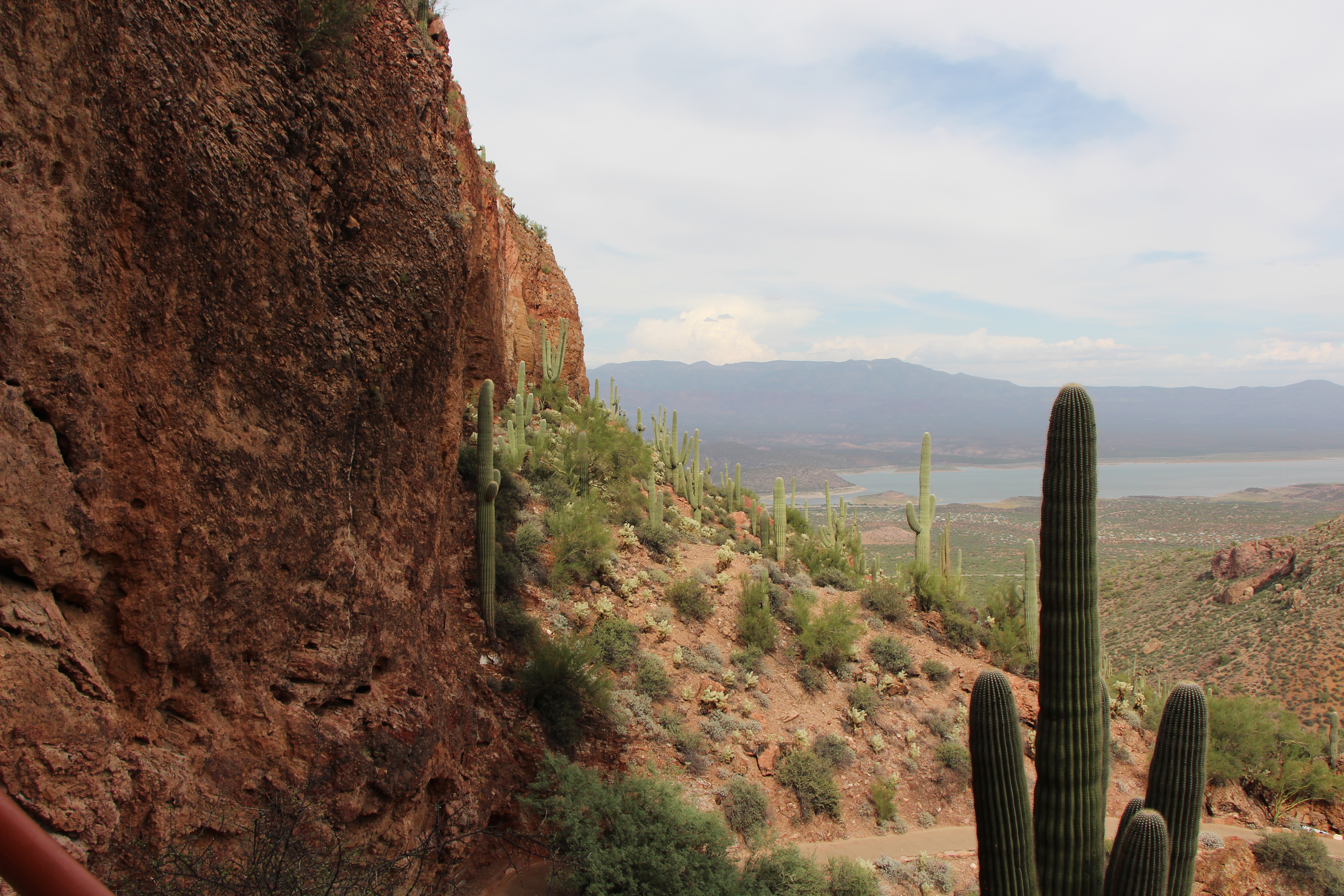
Tonto National Monument, looking east

== See also ==
- List of national monuments of the United States

== Notes ==
=== References ===
- "Tonto National Monument, Arizona". NASA Earth Observatory. Archived from the original on September 5, 2005.
