= Salome Creek =

Stream in Gila County, Arizona

Coordinates: 33°54′57″N 111°01′45″W

Map of Salome Creek

Salome Creek is a watercourse in the Salome Wilderness in central Arizona, United States.

== Natural history ==
The oldest exposed rock forms in the watershed are graphic granite, which dates to 1400 million years before present. The watershed holds a diverse flora and fauna. Within this part of the Sierra Ancha range there are notable disjunctive populations of Coastal woodfern, Dryopteris arguta; this fern is otherwise common in areas nearer the Pacific coast.

== See also ==
- Workman Creek
