= Sierra Ancha =

Mountain range in Gila County, Arizona

Coordinates: 33°57′27″N 111°11′12″W

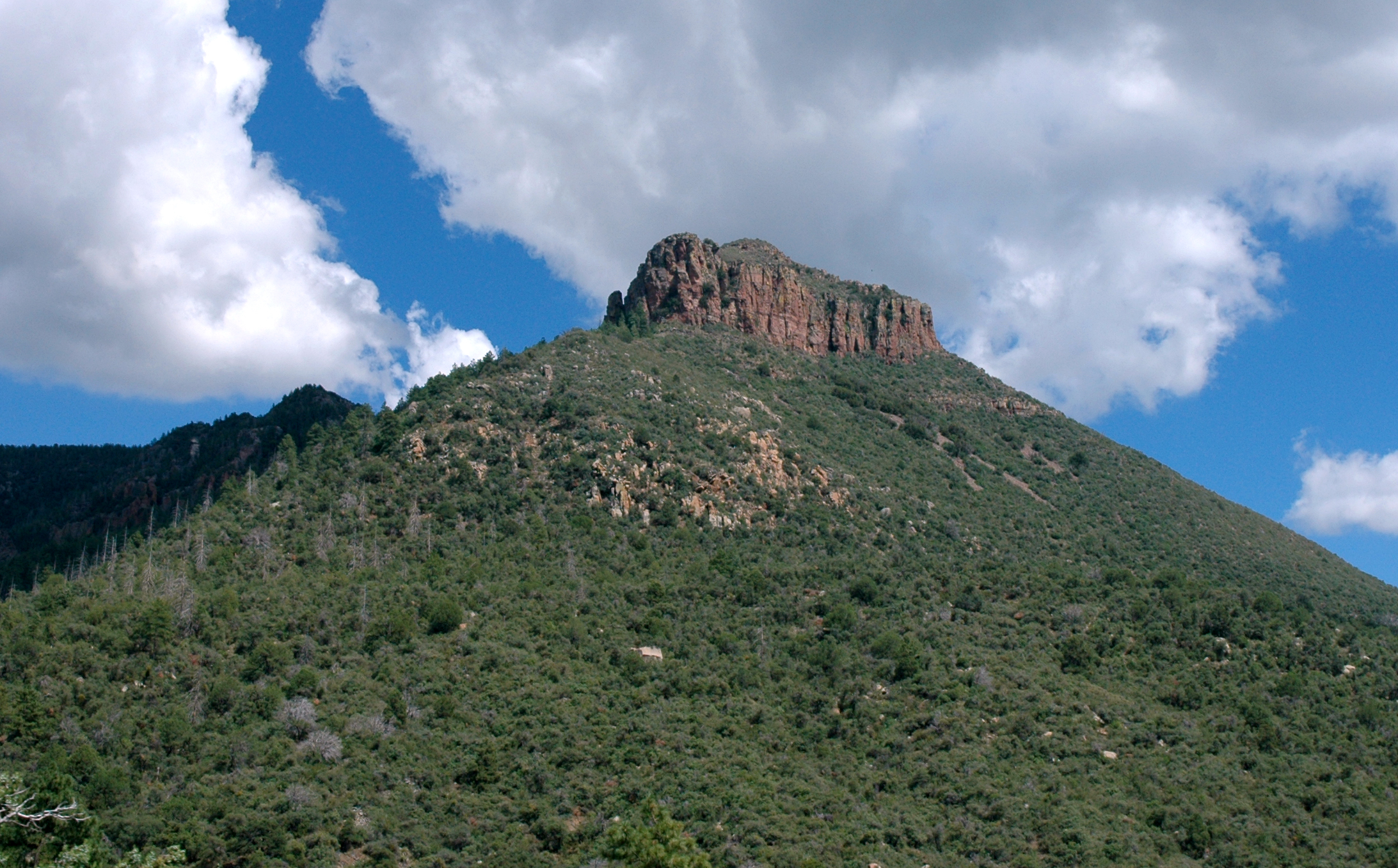
Grantham Peak (6,591 ft) as seen from Arizona State Route 288, the main road leading into the Sierra Ancha mountains from the south.

The Sierra Ancha ("broad range" in Spanish, in Western Apache: Dził Nteel - "Wide Flat Mountain") is a mountain range in Gila County, in central Arizona. It lies between Roosevelt Lake to the south, the Tonto Basin to the west, Cherry Creek to the east, and Pleasant Valley to the north. The range is one of several, including the Bradshaw Mountains, Mingus Mountain of the Black Hills, and the Mazatzal Mountains, which form a transitional zone between the lowland deserts of southern Arizona and the Colorado Plateau of northeastern Arizona. The highest point in the range is Aztec Peak, at an elevation of 2345 m (7694 ft).

The Sierra Ancha is penetrated by few improved roads, and the range is cut by numerous deep, spectacular canyons, particularly on its eastern flank. Little agricultural, commercial, or residential development has taken place, though in the past asbestos mining was carried out at a mine between Asbestos and Zimmerman Points. Cattle ranching is still practiced in the area. Nearby communities include Roosevelt, Tonto Basin, Punkin Center, and Young, Arizona. The Sierra Ancha lies completely within Arizona's Tonto National Forest.

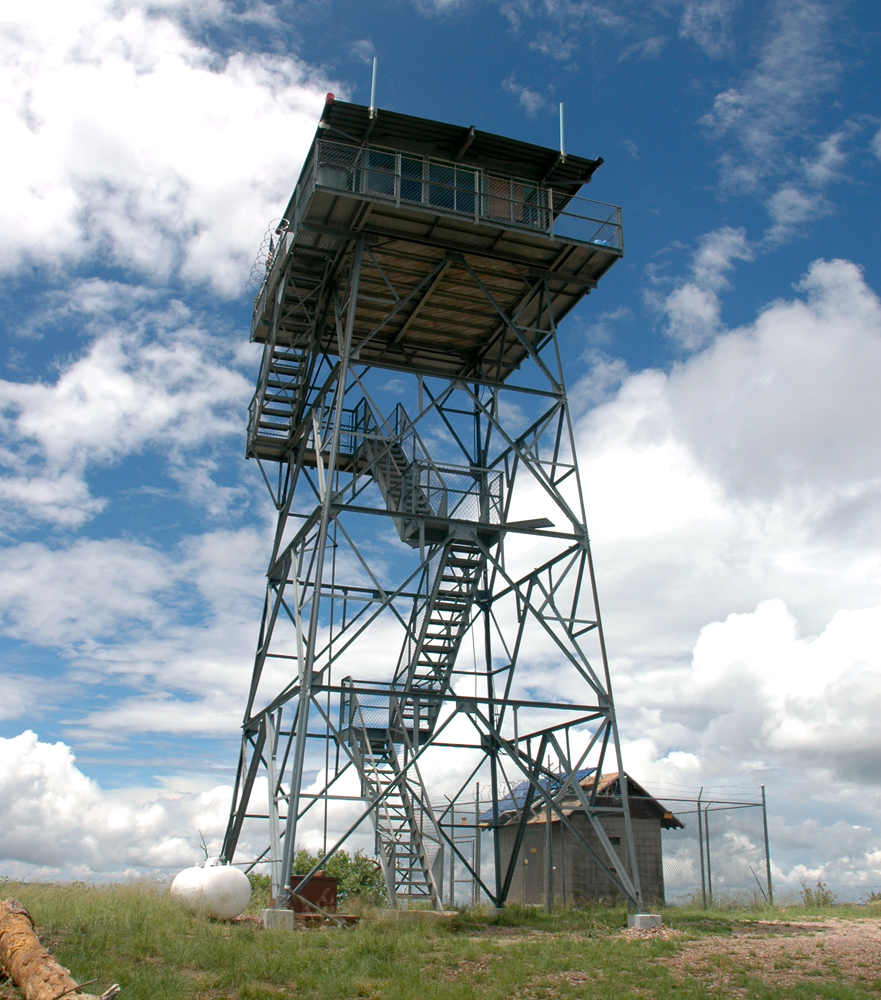
The summit of Aztec peak is the site of a U.S. Forest Service fire lookout once staffed by noted Arizona essayist and novelist Edward Abbey.

Two U.S. Wilderness Areas lie within the Sierra Ancha — the Salome Wilderness, encompassing Salome Creek and its canyon on the southern edge of the range, and the Sierra Ancha Wilderness, protecting the high peaks and deep canyons of the eastern flank of the range. The range also includes the U.S. Forest Service's Sierra Ancha Experimental Forest, a tract on which research on the characteristics of Southwestern U.S. watersheds has been conducted.

The Sierra Ancha includes abundant archaeological remains, especially in the form of cliff dwellings in the rugged canyons opening eastward toward Cherry Creek. The identity of the American Indian builders of these structures remains uncertain, but the sites show characteristics of both the Salado and Mogollon cultures. Tree-ring dating of roof beams from the sites suggests that construction began in about 1280 AD, and that the structures were abandoned by 1350 AD.

== Ecology ==
Prominent streams within the Sierra Ancha are Workman Creek and Salome Creek. The classic Sonoran Desert floristic community of saguaro, palo verde, and creosote bush can be found in the southern foothills above Roosevelt Lake (650–1000 m / 2133–3281 ft), while in the range's middle elevations (1200–1800 m / 3937–5906 ft) oak scrub and juniper predominate. Above 6000 feet (1829 m), the Sierra Ancha has extensive stands of ponderosa pine, with Douglas-fir on the highest, coolest slopes. The Sierra Ancha holds a disjunctive population of coastal woodfern, Dryopteris arguta, which is typically found closer to the Pacific Ocean, owing to the relatively humid climate of the upper elevations of the range.

Climate data for Sierra Ancha, Arizona Altitude: 5,100 feet (1,550 m)
Month	Jan	Feb	Mar	Apr	May	Jun	Jul	Aug	Sep	Oct	Nov	Dec	Year
Record high °F	76	79	84	91	97	105	104	103	103	96	83	78	105
Mean daily maximum °F	53.0	56.7	61.6	69.9	78.1	88.5	91.5	89.0	85.2	75.0	62.9	54.9	72.2
Mean daily minimum °F	30.3	32.6	35.6	41.7	48.5	57.7	62.6	61.7	58.3	48.4	37.6	31.8	45.6
Record low °F	0	10	11	16	22	30	34	38	29	20	12	2	0
Average precipitation inches	3.29	2.57	2.78	1.24	0.53	0.45	2.95	3.46	2.10	1.96	1.90	3.29	26.52
Average snowfall inches	7.1	4.2	3.5	0.7	0.5	0.0	0.0	0.0	0.0	0.0	0.6	3.8	20.4
Record high °C	24	26	29	33	36	41	40	39	39	36	28	26	41
Mean daily maximum °C	11.7	13.7	16.4	21.1	25.6	31.4	33.1	31.7	29.6	23.9	17.2	12.7	22.3
Mean daily minimum °C	−0.9	0.3	2.0	5.4	9.2	14.3	17.0	16.5	14.6	9.1	3.1	−0.1	7.6
Record low °C	−18	−12	−12	−9	−6	−1	1	3	−2	−7	−11	−17	−18
Average precipitation mm	84	65	71	31	13	11	75	88	53	50	48	84	673
Average snowfall cm	18	11	8.9	1.8	1.3	0.0	0.0	0.0	0.0	0.0	1.5	9.7	52.2
Average precipitation days (≥ 0.01 in)	7	6	6	3	2	2	9	10	6	4	4	6	65
Source: WRCC

== Geology ==
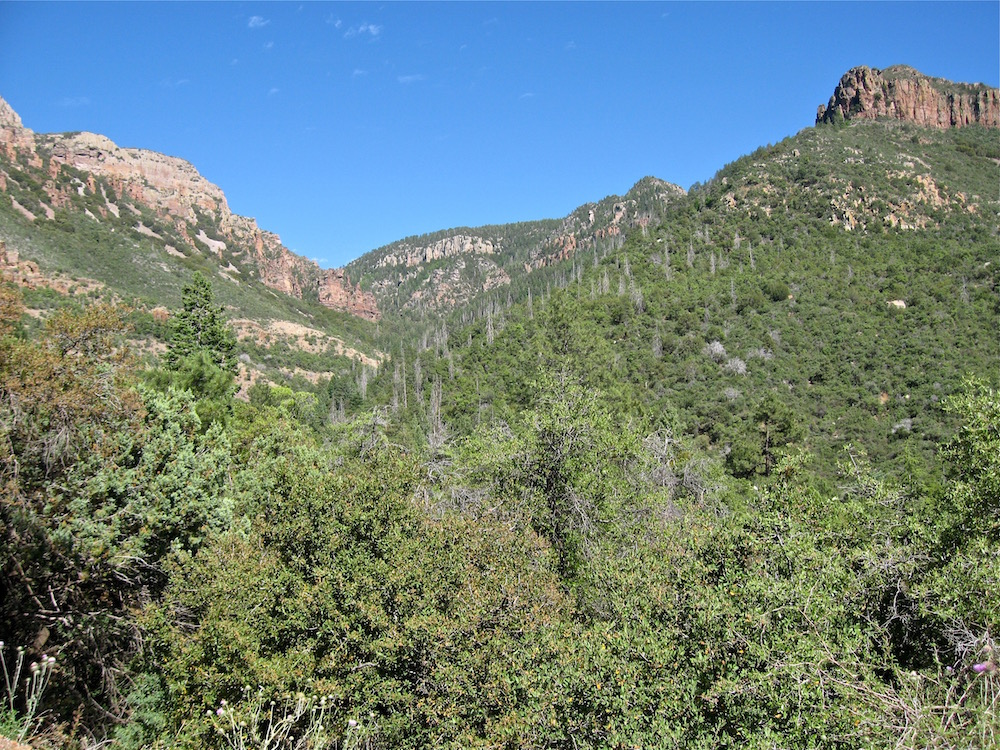
South fork of upper Parker Canyon in the Sierra Ancha, Arizona. Camera station on Arizona State Route 288, at approximately 1,500 m (5,000 ft). The prominent cliffs topping the canyon at left, at approximately 2,120 m (7,000 ft), have been formed from erosion-resistant quartzite.

The Sierra Ancha features significant exposures of the Apache Group, a complex consisting of Proterozoic conglomerate, shale, dolomitic limestone, and quartzite, with large-scale intrusions of diabase. The purplish Dripping Spring Quartzite and white-pinkish Troy Quartzite are much more resistant to weathering than the surrounding strata and form the Sierra Ancha's spectacular cliffs. In lower Parker Canyon, on the range's south face, the Dripping Springs Quartzite forms precipices with a 200 m (700 ft) vertical drop. The light-colored cliffs topping upper Parker Canyon have been formed from the Troy Quartzite. The basement (lowest) rock throughout the range consists of the Proterozoic Ruin Granite. The top of Aztec Peak is capped with a coarse-grained, brown, Cambrian sandstone analogous to the Tapeats Sandstone of the Grand Canyon. The Tapeats Sandstone lies on an unconformity at 850 m (2,790 ft) in the Grand Canyon, whereas at Aztec Peak it appears at about 2,350 m (7,710 ft), a vertical displacement from which can be inferred about 1,500 m (4,900 ft) of ancient uplift, implying that the Sierra Ancha once stood at least 1500 m higher than the range does today, and that the Paleozoic strata which overlie the Tapeats in the Grand Canyon have been removed in the Sierra Ancha through erosion. Gravels consistent with erosional removal and deposition can be found on top of the Colorado Plateau to the north of the Sierra Ancha.
