= Salome Wilderness =

Protected area in Gila County, Arizona

Coordinates: 33°50′20″N 111°03′59″W

Map of Salome Wilderness

The Salome Wilderness of Tonto National Forest is a protected area in the rim country of the southwestern US. The Salome Wilderness lies within the Sierra Ancha mountain range in Gila County, Arizona.

== Ecology ==
Prominent perennial streams within this wilderness area are Workman Creek and Salome Creek. The region has a diverse flora and fauna. Within this part of the Sierra Ancha Range, there are notable disjunctive populations of Coastal woodfern, Dryopteris arguta; this fern is otherwise common in areas nearer the Pacific coast.
