= Workman Creek =

Watercourse in Gila County, Arizona

Coordinates: 33.5238°N 111.0221°W

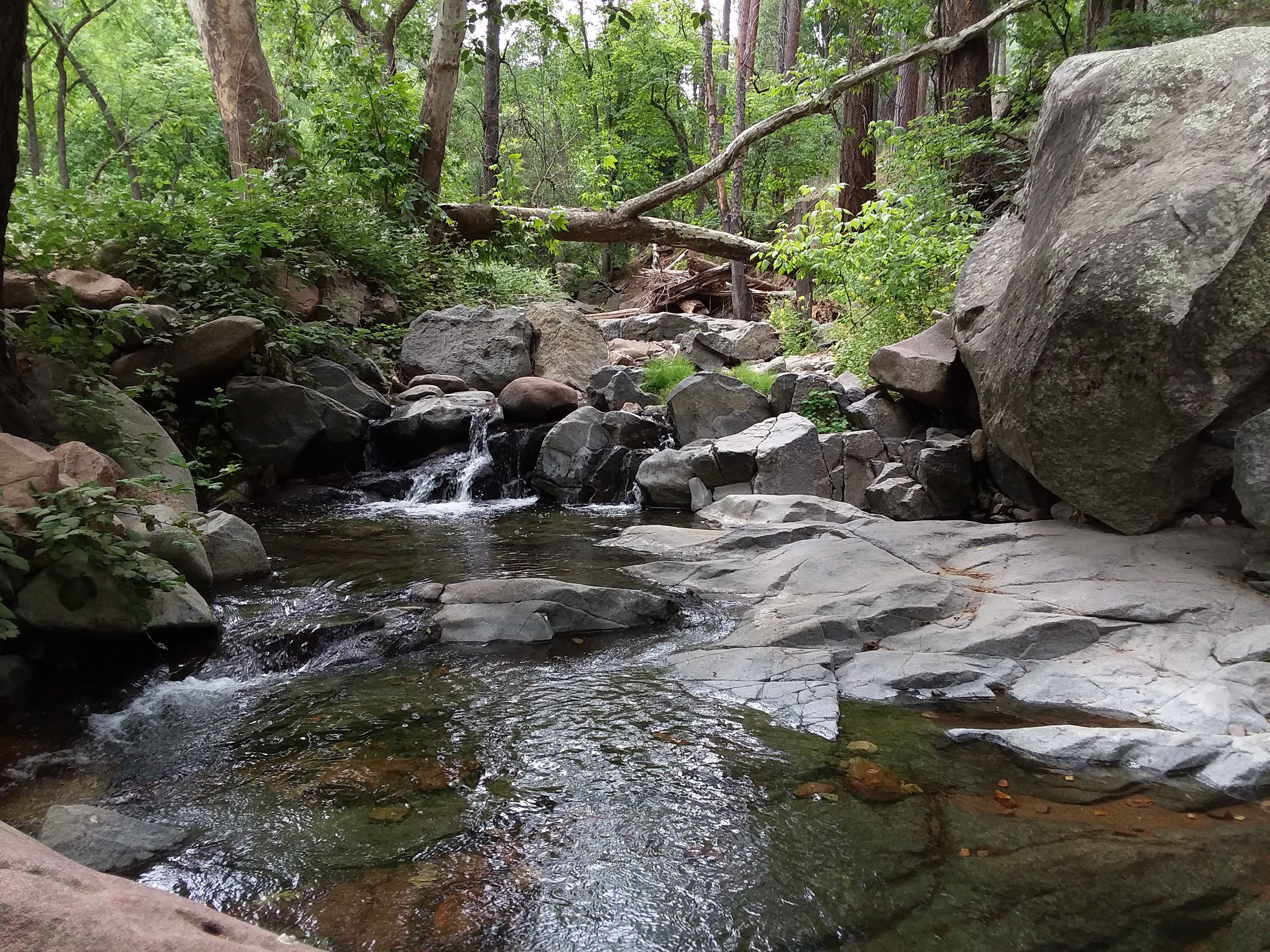
Riparian habitat along Workman Creek, AZ.

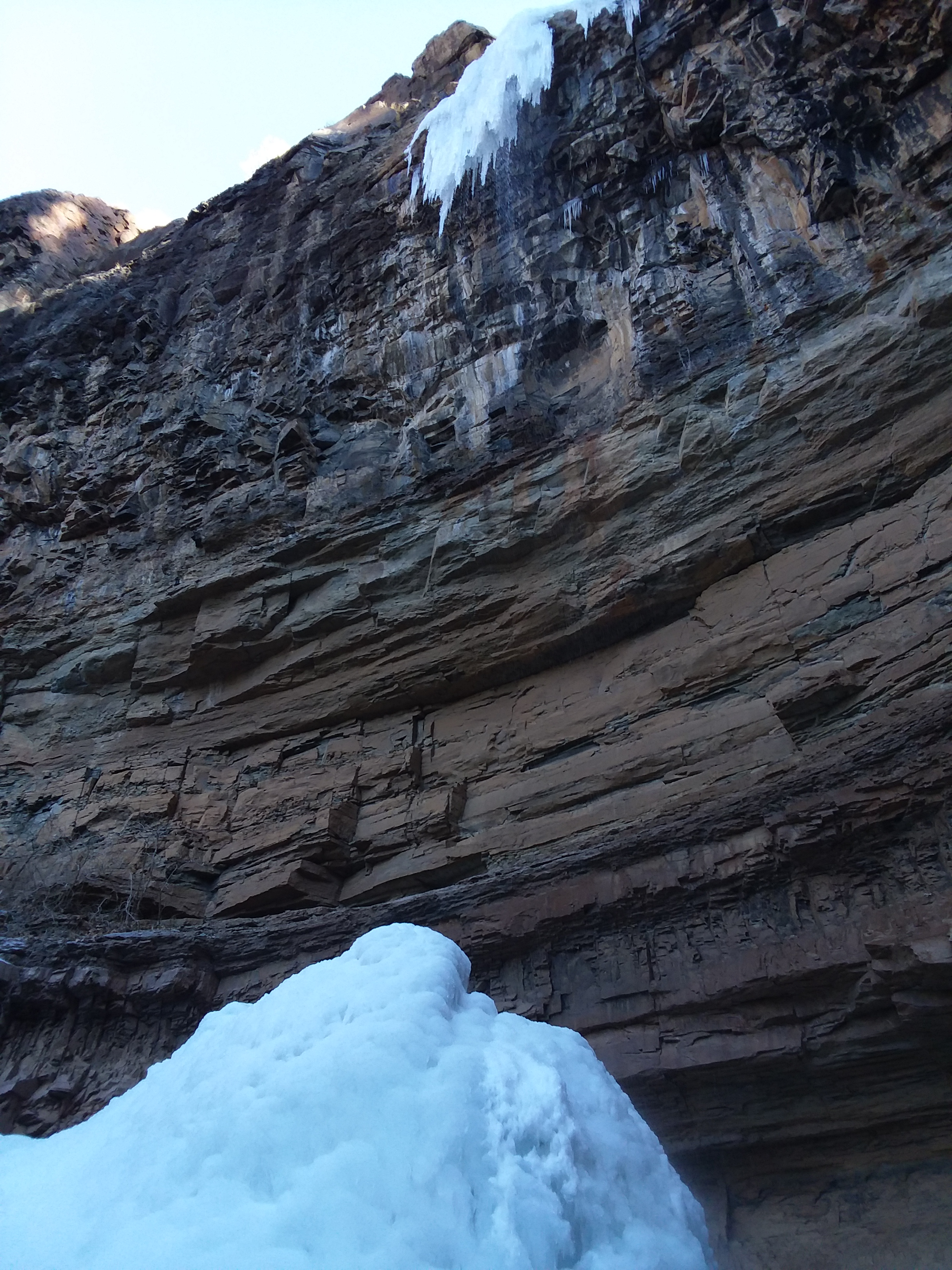
Workman Creek falls, Arizona in winter.

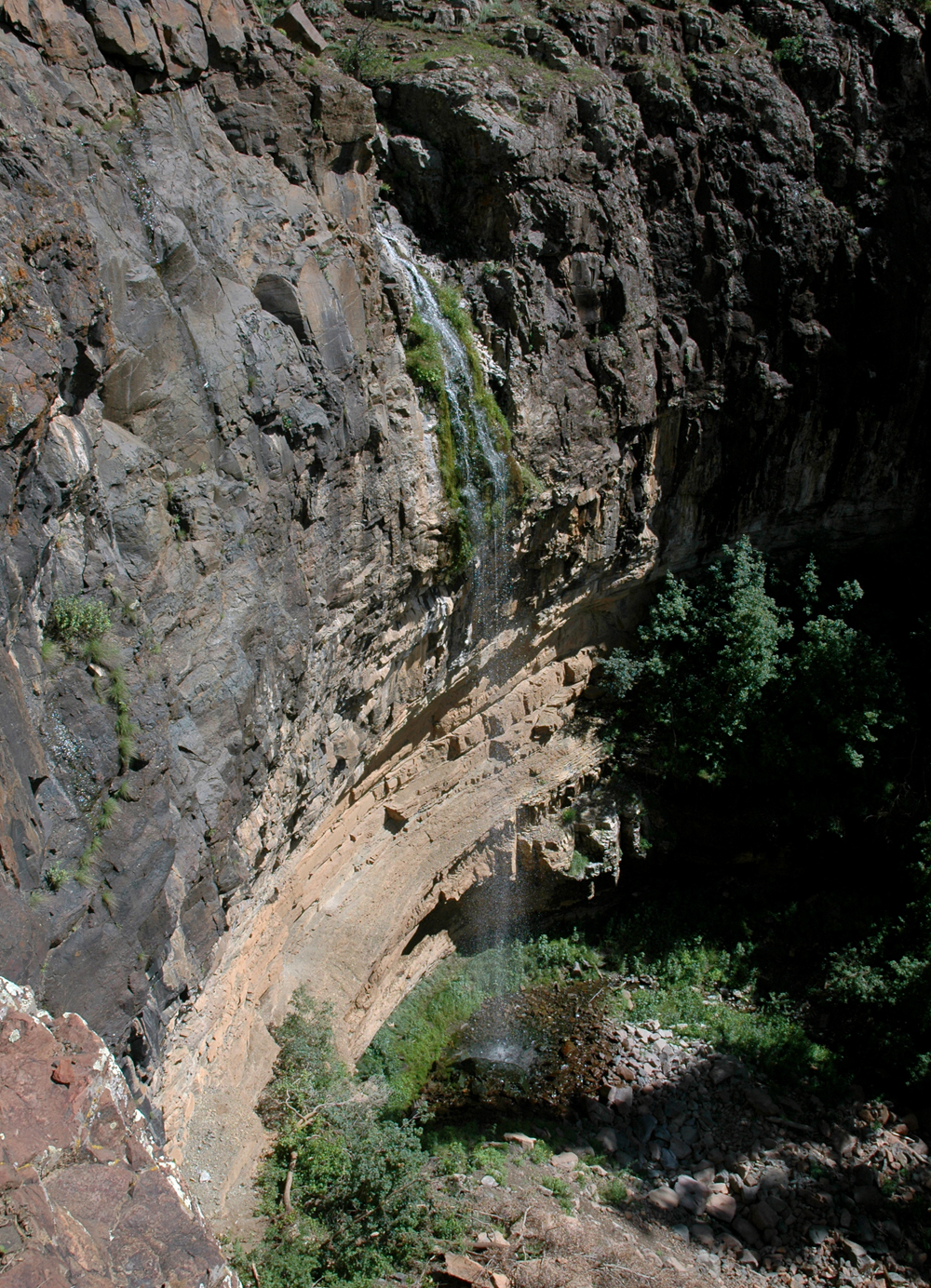
Workman Creek Falls

Map of Workman Creek

Workman Creek is a watercourse in the Salome Wilderness in central Arizona, United States.

== Natural history ==
The oldest exposed rock forms in the general area are Runite granite, which dates to 1400 million years before present. The watershed holds a diverse flora and fauna. Within this part of the Sierra Ancha Range there are notable disjunctive populations of Coastal woodfern, Dryopteris arguta; this fern is otherwise common in areas nearer the Pacific coast.

== See also ==
- Salome Creek
