= Pegmatite =

Igneous rock with very large interlocked crystals

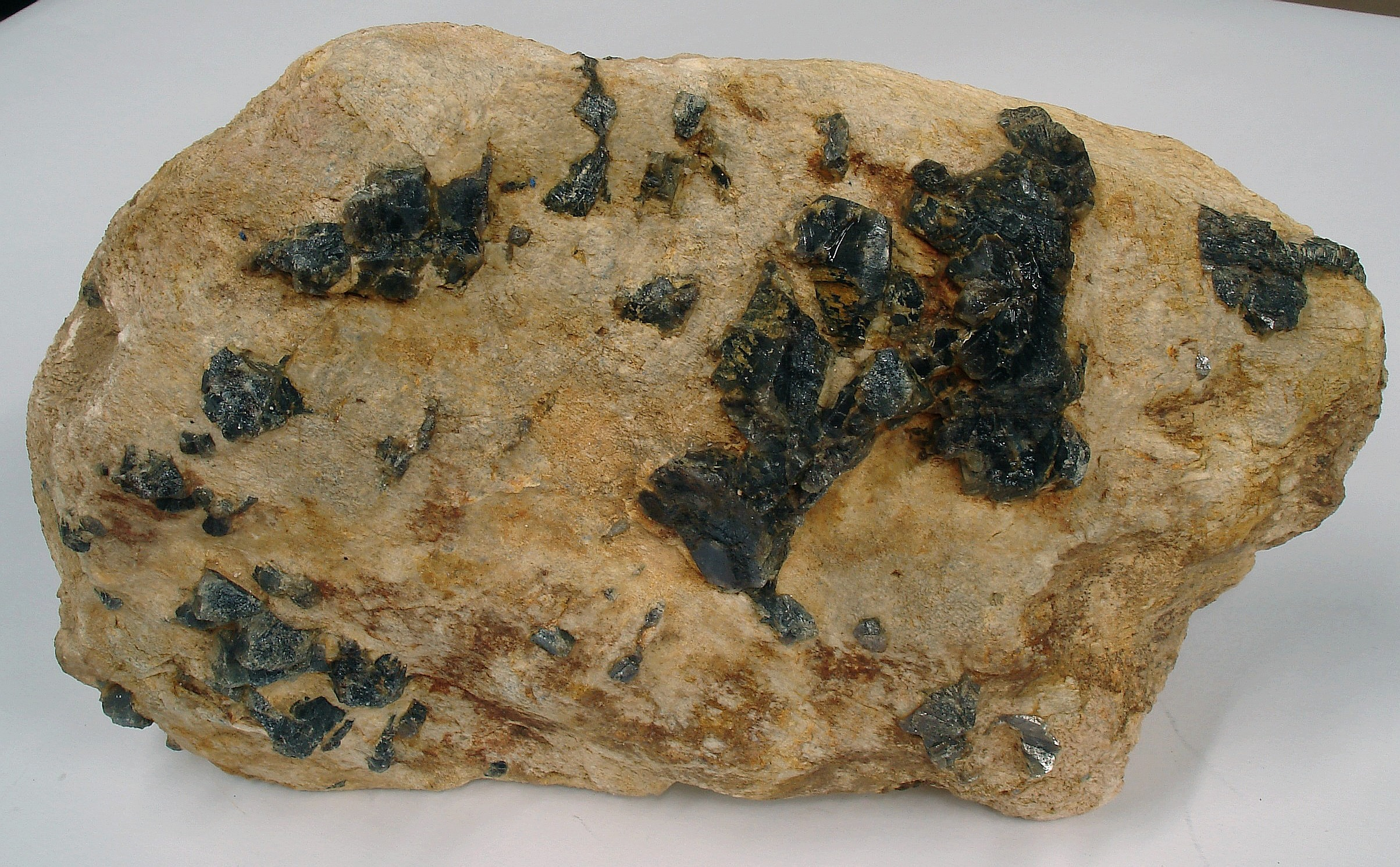
Pegmatite with blue corundum crystals

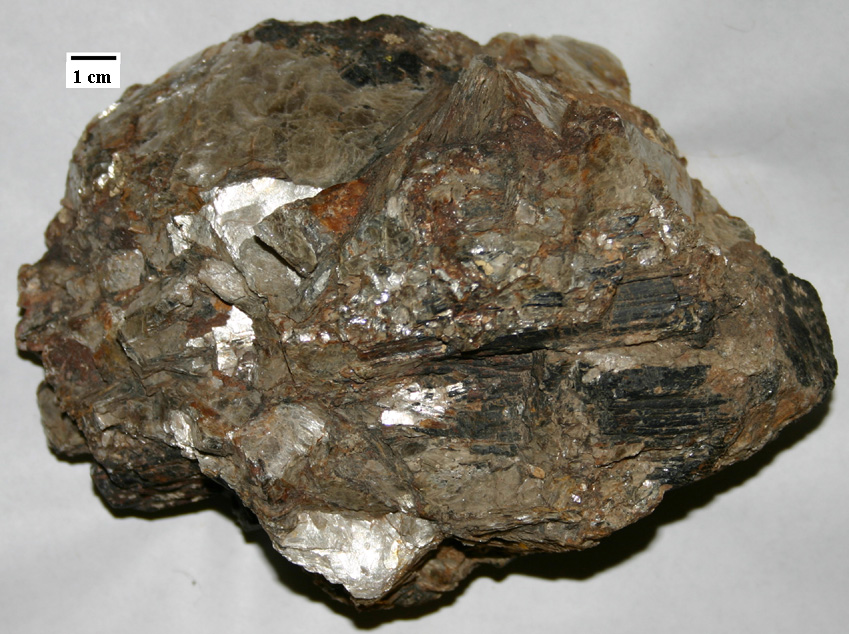
Pegmatite containing lepidolite, tourmaline, and quartz from the White Elephant Mine in the Black Hills, South Dakota

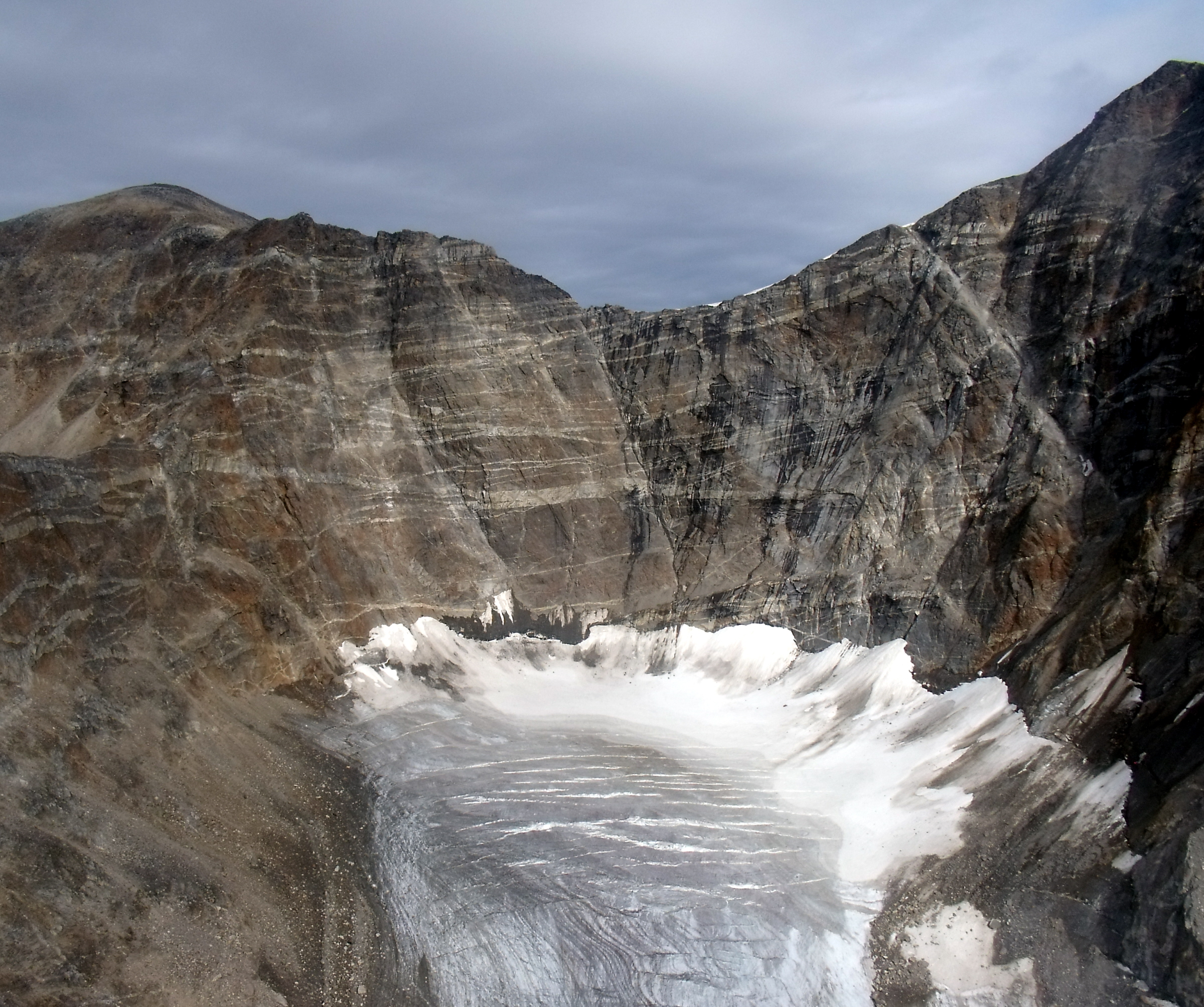
Proterozoic pegmatite swarm in the headwall of the cirque of a small mountain glacier, northeastern Baffin Island, Nunavut

A pegmatite is an igneous rock showing a very coarse texture, with large interlocking crystals usually greater in size than 1 cm (0.4 in) and sometimes greater than 1 meter (3 ft). Most pegmatites are composed of quartz, feldspar, and mica, having a similar silicic composition to granite. However, rarer intermediate composition and mafic pegmatites are known.

Many of the world's largest crystals are found within pegmatites. These include crystals of microcline, quartz, mica, spodumene, beryl, and tourmaline. Some individual crystals are over 10 m (33 ft) long.

Most pegmatites are thought to form from the last fluid fraction of a large crystallizing magma body. This residual fluid is highly enriched in volatiles and trace elements, and its very low viscosity allows components to migrate rapidly to join an existing crystal rather than coming together to form new crystals. This allows a few very large crystals to form. While most pegmatites have a simple composition of minerals common in ordinary igneous rock, a few pegmatites have a complex composition, with numerous unusual minerals of rare elements. These complex pegmatites are mined for lithium, beryllium, boron, fluorine, tin, tantalum, niobium, rare earth elements, uranium, and other valuable commodities.

== Etymology ==
The word pegmatite derives from Homeric Greek, πήγνυμι (pēgnymi), which means “to bind together”, in reference to the intertwined crystals of quartz and feldspar in the texture known as graphic granite. The term was first used by René Just Haüy in 1822 as a synonym for graphic granite. Wilhelm Karl Ritter von Haidinger first used the term in its present meaning in 1845.

== General description ==
Pegmatites are exceptionally coarse-grained igneous rocks composed of interlocking crystals, with individual crystals usually over 1 centimeter (0.4 in) in size and sometimes exceeding 1 meter (3 ft). Most pegmatites have a composition similar to granite, so that their most common minerals are quartz, feldspar, and mica. However, other pegmatite compositions are known, including compositions similar to nepheline syenite or gabbro. The term pegmatite is thus purely a textural description. Geologists typically prefix the term with a compositional description, so that granitic pegmatite is a pegmatite with the composition of granite while nepheline syenite pegmatite is a pegmatite with the composition of nepheline syenite. However, the British Geological Survey (BGS) discourages this usage, preferring terms like biotite-quartz-feldspar pegmatite for a pegmatite with a typical granitic composition, dominated by feldspar with lesser quartz and biotite. Under BGS terminology, a pegmatitic rock (for example, a pegmatitic gabbro) is a coarse-grained rock containing patches of much coarser-grained rock of essentially the same composition.

Individual crystals in pegmatites can be enormous in size. It is likely that the largest crystals ever found were feldspar crystals in pegmatites from Karelia with masses of thousands of tons. Quartz crystals with masses measured in thousands of pounds and micas over 10 meters (33 ft) across and 4 meters (13 ft) thick have been found. Spodumene crystals over 12 meters (40 ft) long have been found in the Black Hills of South Dakota, and beryl crystals 8.2 meters (27 ft) long and 1.8 meters (6 ft) in diameter have been found at Albany, Maine. The largest beryl crystal ever found was from Malakialina on Madagascar, weighing about 380 tons, with a length of 18 m (59 ft) and a crosscut of 3.5 m (11 ft).

Pegmatite bodies are usually of minor size compared to typical intrusive rock bodies. Pegmatite body size is on the order of magnitude of one to a few hundred meters. Compared to typical igneous rocks they are rather inhomogeneous and may show zones with different mineral assemblages. Crystal size and mineral assemblages are usually oriented parallel to the wall rock or even concentric for pegmatite lenses.

== Classification ==
Modern pegmatite classification schemes are strongly influenced by the depth-zone classification of granitic rocks published by Buddington (1959), and the Ginsburg & Rodionov (1960) and Ginsburg et al. (1979) classification which categorized pegmatites according to their depth of emplacement and relationship to metamorphism and granitic plutons. Cerny’s (1991) revision of that classification scheme is widely used, Cerny’s (1991) pegmatite classification, which is a combination of emplacement depth, metamorphic grade and minor element content, has provided significant insight into the origin of pegmatitic melts and their relative degrees of fractionation.

Granitic pegmatites are commonly ranked into three hierarchies (class – family – type – subtype) depending upon their mineralogical-geochemical characteristics and depth of emplacement according to Cerny (1991). Classes are Abyssal, Muscovite, Rare-Element and Miarolitic. The Rare-Element Class is subdivided based on composition into LCT and NYF families: LCT for Lithium, Cesium, and Tantalum enrichment and NYF for Niobium, Yttrium, and Fluorine enrichment. Most authors classify pegmatites according to LCT- and NYF-types and subtypes. Another important contribution of the classification is the petrogenetic component of the classification, which shows the association of LCT pegmatites with mainly orogenic plutons, and NYF pegmatites with mainly anorogenic plutons.

There have been a few attempts to create a new classification for pegmatites less dependent on mineralogy and more reflective of their geological setting. Among these is Wise's (2022) pegmatite classification, which focuses mostly on the source of the magma from which the pegmatite crystalizes.

== Petrology ==
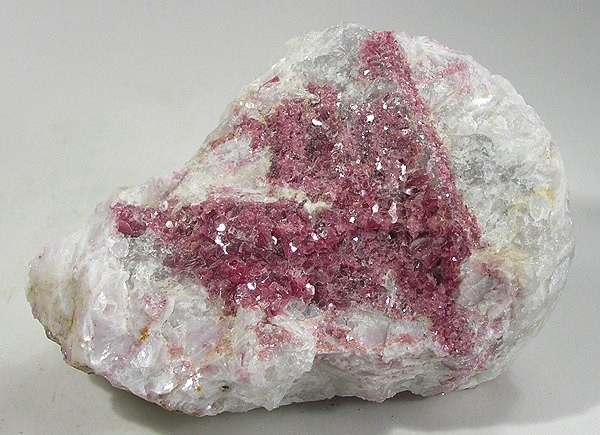
Rose muscovite from the Harding Pegmatite Mine

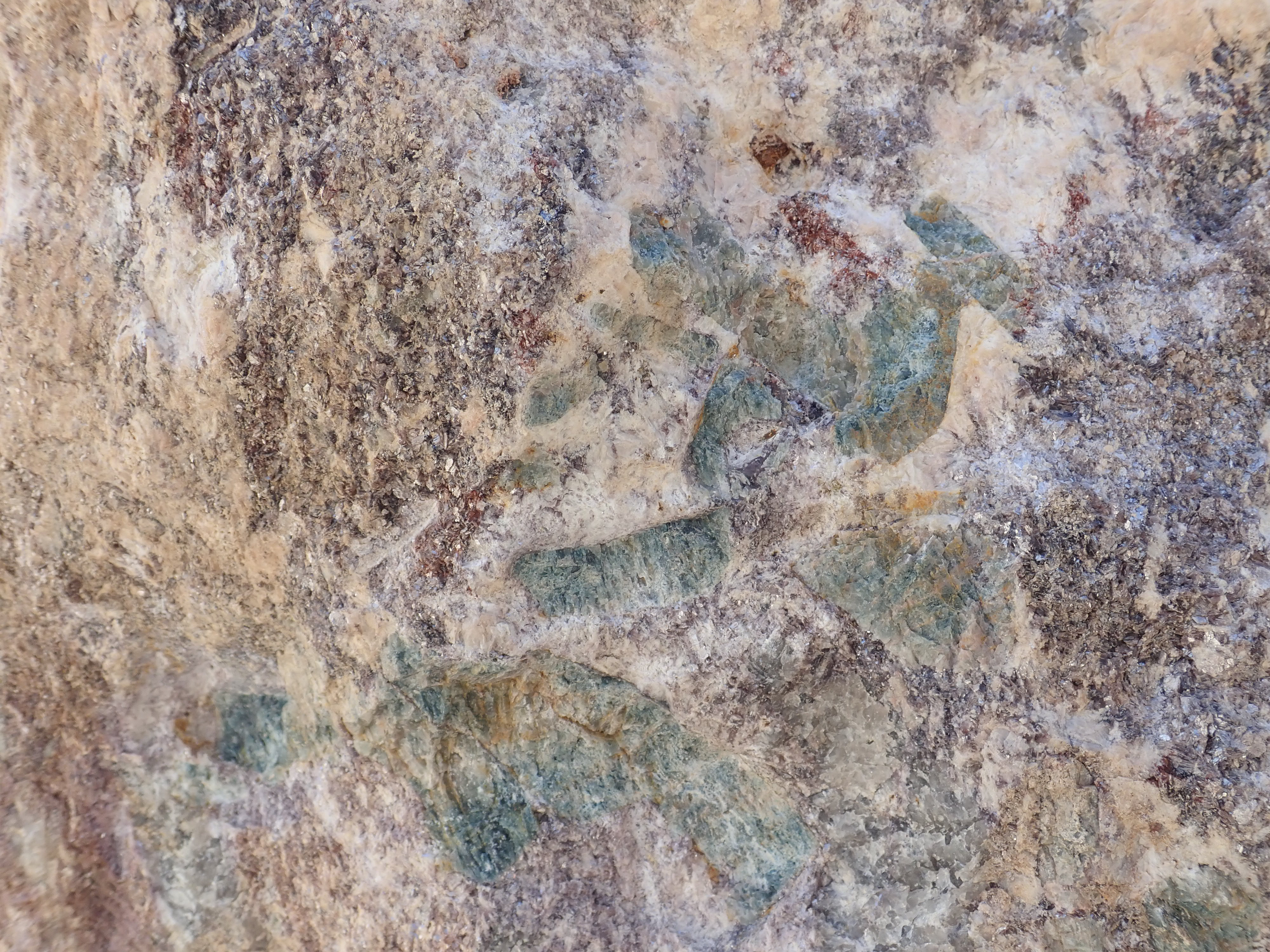
Blue apatite crystals at the Harding pegmatite mine

Pegmatites form under conditions in which the rate of new crystal nucleation is much slower than the rate of crystal growth. Large crystals are favored. In normal igneous rocks, coarse texture is a result of slow cooling deep underground. It is not clear if pegmatite forms by slow or rapid cooling. In some studies, crystals in pegmatitic conditions have been recorded to grow at a rate ranging from 1 m to 10 m per day. Pegmatites are the last part of a magma body to crystallize. This final fluid fraction is enriched in volatile and trace elements. The residual magma undergoes phase separation into a melt phase and a hydrous fluid phase saturated with silica, alkalis, and other elements. Such phase separation requires formation from a wet magma, rich enough in water to saturate before more than two-thirds of the magma is crystallized. Otherwise, the separation of the fluid phase is difficult to explain. Granite requires a water content of 4 wt% at a pressure of 0.5 GPa (72,500 psi), but only 1.5 wt% at 0.1 GPa (14,500 psi) for phase separation to take place.

The volatiles (primarily water, borates, fluorides, chlorides, and phosphates) are concentrated in the hydrous phase, greatly lowering its viscosity. The silica in the hydrous phase is completely depolymerized, existing almost entirely as orthosilicate, with all oxygen bridges between silicon ions broken. The low viscosity promotes rapid diffusion through the fluid, allowing growth of large crystals.

When this hydrous fluid is injected into the surrounding country rock, minerals crystallize from the outside in to form a zoned pegmatite, with different minerals predominating in concentric zones. A typical sequence of deposition begins with microcline and quartz, with minor schorl and garnet. This is followed by deposition of albite, lepidolite, gem tourmaline, beryl, spodumene, amblygonite, topaz, apatite, and fluorite, which may partially replace some of the minerals in the earlier zone. The center of the pegmatite may have cavities lined with spectacular gemstone crystals.

Some pegmatites have more complex zoning. Five distinct zones are recognized in the Harding Pegmatite in the Picuris Mountains of northern New Mexico, US. These are:

- A white border rind of fine-grained quartz-albite muscovite pegmatite.
- A continuous layer of very coarse quartz, albite, and muscovite. This zone also contains microcline, and has abundant accessory apatite, beryl, and tantalite. Beryl is occasionally very coarse and abundant.
- A continuous layer of massive quartz. This zone is also rich in muscovite, microcline, and cleavelandite.
- A spectacular quartz and lath-spodumene zone. The spodumene occurs as blade-like crystals, sometimes of enormous size, mostly oriented at random but sometimes arranged to form a comb-like structure. Accessory minerals are beryl, apatite, microcline, and tantalum-niobium minerals, especially in the lower part of this zone. There is some pseudomorphic replacement of spodumene by rose muscovite and quartz by cleavelandite.
- The core of the pegmatite, known as "spotted rock", which is relatively fine-grained spodumene, microcline, and quartz, with accompanying finer-grained albite, lithium-bearing muscovite, lepidolite, microlite, and tantalite. Much of the spodumene and microcline have been extensively corroded and replaced by fine-grained micas.

Large crystals nucleate on the margins of pegmatites, becoming larger as they grow inward. These include very large conical alkali feldspar crystals. Aplites are commonly present. These may cut across the pegmatite, but also form zones or irregular patches around coarser material. The aplites are often layered, showing evidence of deformation. Xenoliths may be found in the body of the pegmatite, but their original mineral content is replaced by quartz and alkali feldspar, so that they are difficult to distinguish from the surrounding pegmatite. Pegmatite also commonly replaces part of the surrounding country rock.

Because pegmatites likely crystallize from a fluid-dominated phase, rather than a melt phase, they straddle the boundary between hydrothermal mineral deposits and igneous intrusions. Although there is broad agreement on the basic mechanisms by which they form, the details of pegmatite formation remain enigmatic. Pegmatites have characteristics inconsistent with other igneous intrusions. They are not porphyritic, and show no chilled margin. On the contrary, the largest crystals are often found on the margins of the pegmatite body. While aplites are sometimes found on the margins, they are as likely to occur within the body of the pegmatite. The crystals are never aligned in a way that would indicate flow, but are perpendicular to the walls. This implies formation in a static environment. Some pegmatites take the form of isolated pods, with no obvious feeder conduit. As a result, metamorphic or metasomatic origins have sometimes been suggested for pegmatites. A metamorphic pegmatite would be formed by removal of volatiles from metamorphic rocks, particularly felsic gneiss, to liberate the right constituents and water, at the right temperature. A metasomatic pegmatite would be formed by hydrothermal circulation of hot alteration fluids upon a rock mass, with bulk chemical and textural change. Metasomatism is currently not favored as a mechanism for pegmatite formation and it is likely that metamorphism and magmatism are both contributors toward the conditions necessary for pegmatite genesis.

== Mineralogy ==
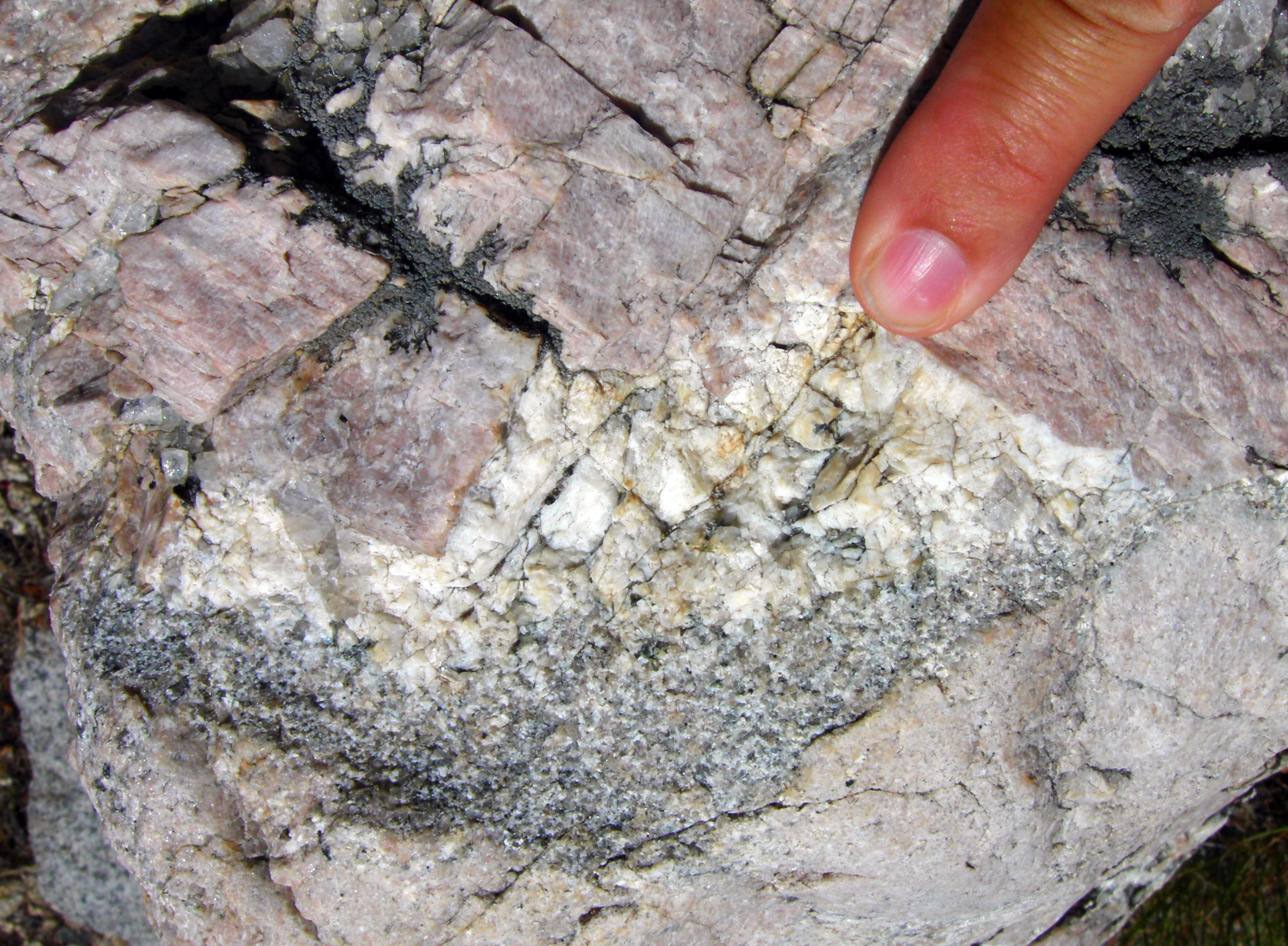
Pegmatitic granite with pink potassium feldspar crystals, surrounding a finer-grained cumulate-filled enclave, Rock Creek Canyon, eastern Sierra Nevada, California

Most pegmatites have a simple composition, often being composed entirely of minerals common in granite, such as feldspar, mica, and quartz. The feldspar and quartz often show graphic texture. Rarely, pegmatites are extremely enriched in incompatible elements, such as lithium, caesium, beryllium, tin, niobium, zirconium, uranium, thorium, boron, phosphorus, and fluorine. These complex pegmatites contain unusual minerals of these elements, such as beryl, spodumene, lepidolite, amblygonite, topaz, apatite, fluorite, tourmaline, triphylite, columbite, monazite, and molybdenite. Some of these can be important ore minerals. Some gemstones, such as emerald, are found almost exclusively in pegmatites.

Nepheline syenite pegmatites typically contain zirconium, titanium, and rare earth element minerals.

Gabbroic pegmatites typically consist of exceptionally coarse interlocking pyroxene and plagioclase.

== Geochemistry ==
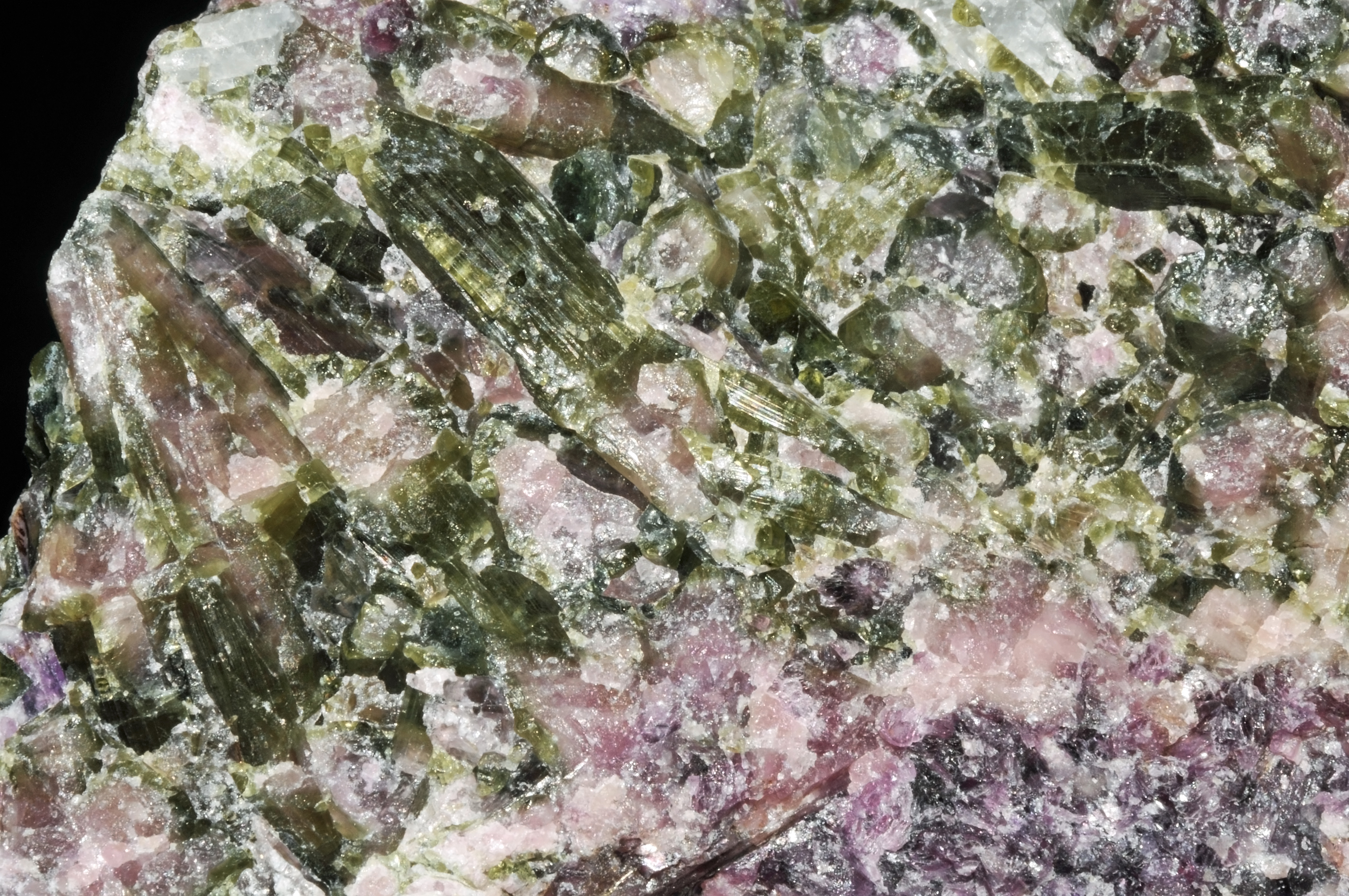
Elbaite tourmaline (olive-green) and lepidolite mica (violet), from a lithium-enriched pegmatite in Brazil

Pegmatites are enriched in volatile and incompatible elements, consistent with their likely origin as the final melt fraction of a crystallizing body of magma. However, it is difficult to get a representative composition of a pegmatite, due to the large size of the constituent mineral crystals. Hence, pegmatite is often characterised by sampling the individual minerals that compose the pegmatite, and comparisons are made according to mineral chemistry. A common error is to assume that the wall zone is a chilled margin whose composition is representative of the original melt.

Pegmatites derived from batholiths can be divided into a family of NYF pegmatites, characterized by progressive enrichment in niobium, yttrium, and fluorine as well as enrichment in beryllium, rare earth elements, scandium, titanium, zirconium, thorium, and uranium; and a family of LCT pegmatites, characterized by progressive accumulation of lithium, caesium, and tantalum, as well as enrichment in rubidium, beryllium, tin, barium, phosphorus, and fluorine.

The NYF pegmatites likely fractionated from A- to I-type granites that were relatively low in aluminium (subaluminous to metaluminous granites). These granites originated from depleted crust or mantle rock. LCT pegmatites most likely formed from S-type granites or possibly I-type granites, with a higher aluminium content (peraluminous granites).

Intermediate pegmatites (NYF + LCT pegmatites) are known and may have formed by contamination of an initially NYF magma body with melted undepleted supracrustral rock.

== Economic importance ==
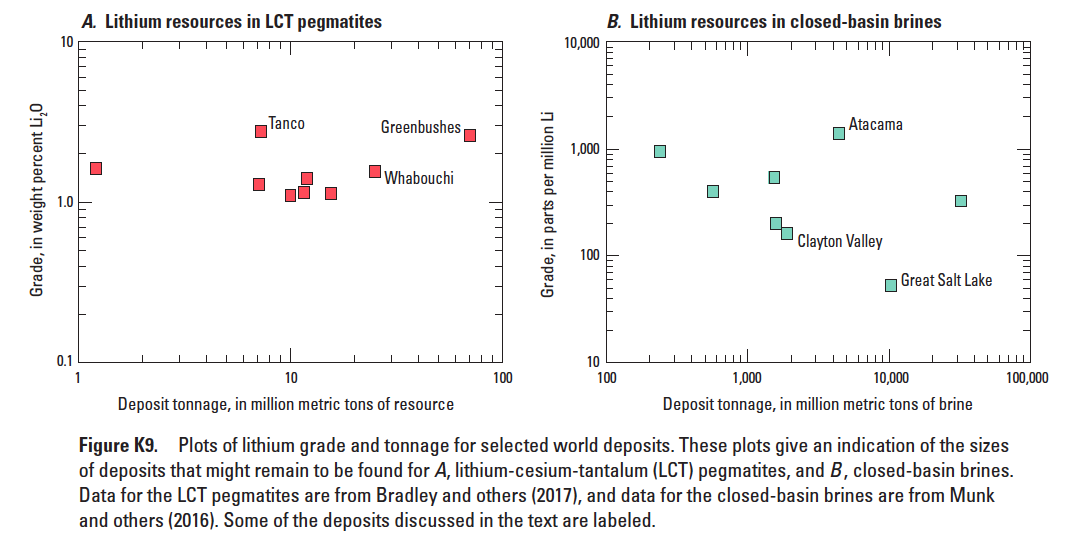
Scatter plots of lithium grade and tonnage for selected world deposits, as of 2017

Pegmatites often contain rare elements and gemstones. Examples include aquamarine, tourmaline, topaz, fluorite, apatite, and corundum, often along with tin, rare earth, and tungsten minerals, among others. Pegmatites have been mined for both quartz and feldspar. For quartz mining, pegmatites with central quartz masses have been of particular interest.

Pegmatites are the primary source of lithium either as spodumene, lithiophyllite or usually from lepidolite. The primary source for caesium is pollucite, a mineral from a zoned pegmatite. The majority of the world's beryllium is sourced from non-gem quality beryl within pegmatite. Tantalum, niobium, and rare-earth elements are sourced from a few pegmatites worldwide, such as the Greenbushes Pegmatite, the Kibara Belt of Rwanda and Democratic Republic of the Congo, the Kenticha mine of Ethiopia the Alto Ligonha Province of Mozambique, and the Mibra (Volta) mine of Minas Gerais, Brazil.

== Occurrence ==
Notable pegmatite occurrences are found worldwide within the major cratons, and within greenschist-facies metamorphic belts. However, pegmatite localities are only well recorded when economic mineralisation is found.

Pegmatites are found as irregular dikes, sills, or veins, and are most common at the margins of batholiths (great masses of intrusive igneous rock). Most are closely related spatially and genetically to large intrusions. They may take the form of veins or dikes in the intrusion itself, but more commonly, they extend into the surrounding country rock, especially above the intrusion.

Some pegmatites surrounded by metamorphic rock have no obvious connection to a larger intrusion. Pegmatites in low-grade metamorphic rock tend to be dominated by quartz and carbonate minerals. Pegmatites in metamorphic rock of higher grade are dominated by alkali feldspar.

Gabbroic pegmatites typically occur as lenses within bodies of gabbro or diabase. Nepheline syenite pegmatites are common in alkaline igneous complexes.

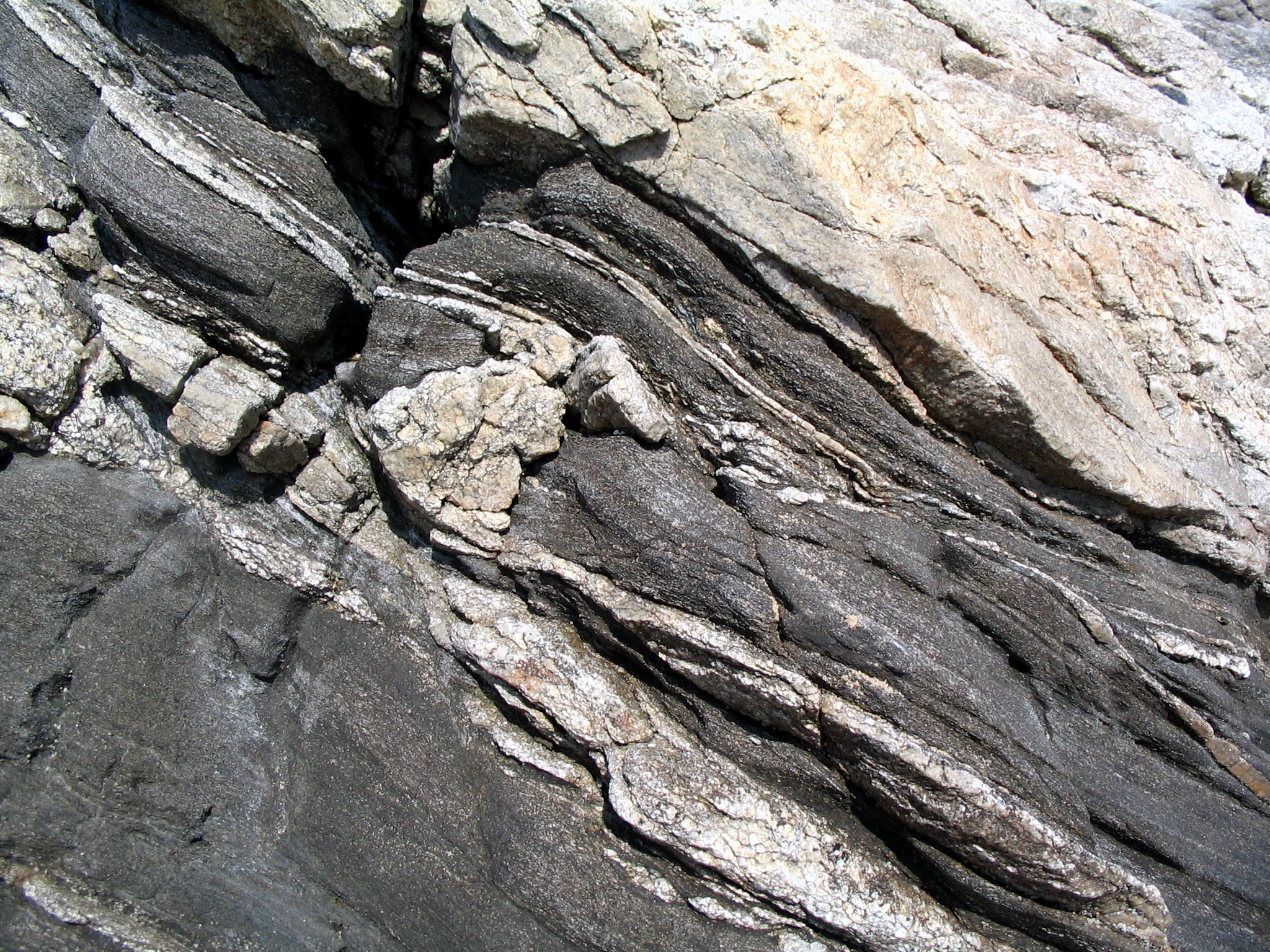
Pegmatite (light colored) in dark mica schist, Île de Noirmoutier, France

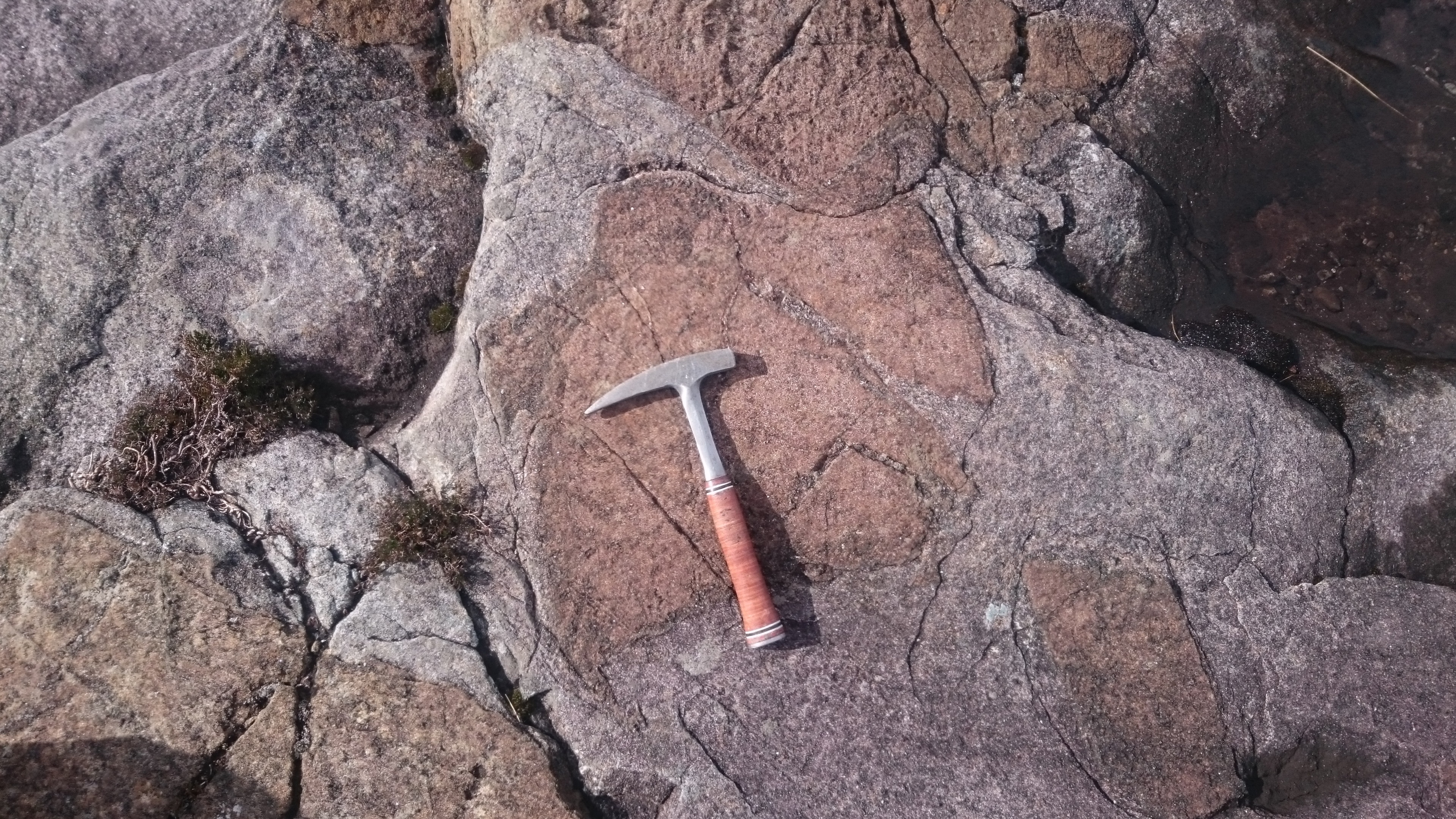
Pegmatite (pink), Isle of Skye, Scotland

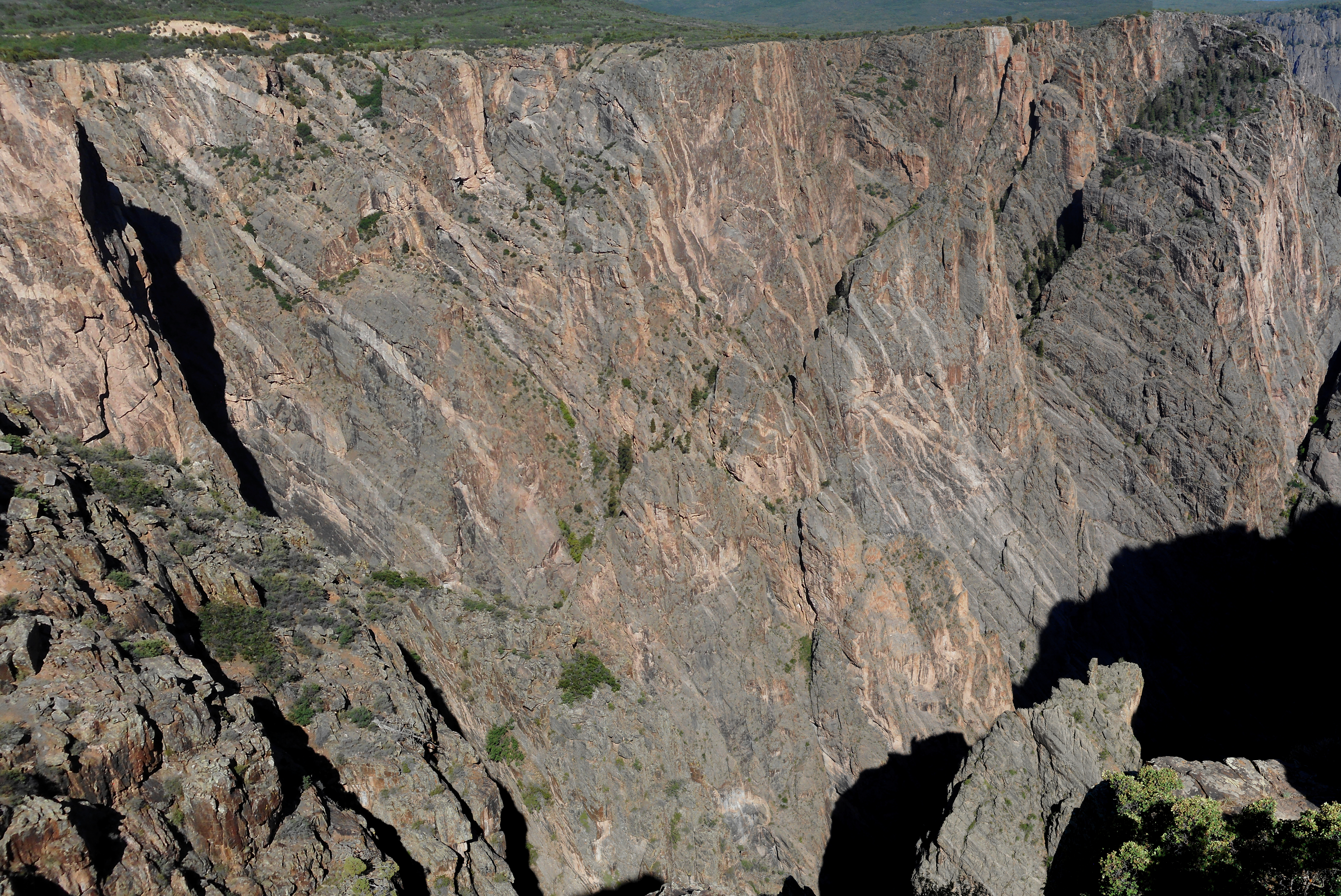
Potassium feldspar pegmatites at the Black Canyon of the Gunnison National Park, Colorado

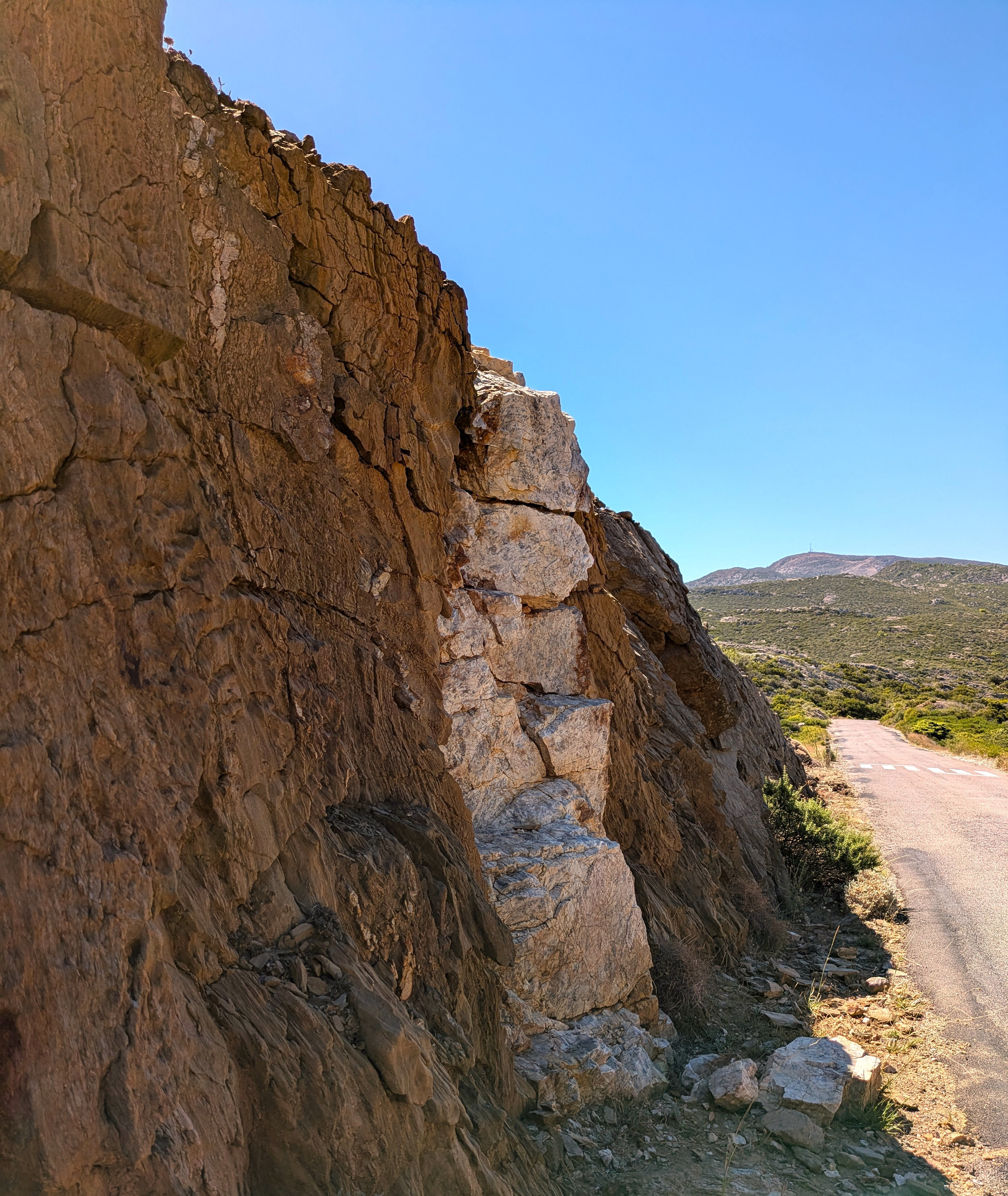
Hercynian pegmatite dike intruded into Ediacaran schist, Cap de Creus peninsula, Catalonia, Spain

== See also ==
- Phanerite
- Aphanite
- Porphyritic
