= Apache Group (geology) =

The Apache Group is a Mesoproterozoic group of geologic formations in the southwestern United States.

The Apache Group—or some underlying Vishnu Basement Rocks (Ruin Granite)—are prominently found in all of the Sierra Ancha range, the range being separated by faults from its neighboring Mazatzal Mountains west, and the Salt River to the south. The Apache Group extends to regions east of the Sierra Ancha, and also regionally to Globe just south-southeast, and the neighboring Dripping Spring Mountains, again just south of the Globe region.

The Apache Group in descending order from youngest to oldest geologic units:

- D-Troy Quartzite
- C-Mescal Limestone
- B-Dripping Spring Quartzite
  - Barnes Conglomerate (Globe, Arizona region, lowest of Dripping Spring Q.)
- A-Pioneer Shale
  - Scanlon Conglomerate (lowest of Pioneer Shale)
