= Dripping Spring Quartzite =

Quartzite formation in Arizona, USA

- Stratigraphic range: Mesoproterozoic, ~1,400 Ma (1.4 Ba)
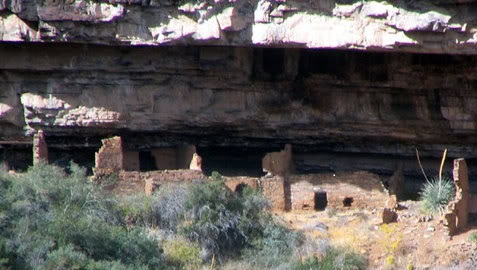
- Site of Sierra Ancha Cliff Dwellings in cliffs of purplish Dripping Spring Quartzite
- Type: Geological formation
- Underlies: Mescal Limestone
- Overlies: Pioneer Shale
- Thickness: 620 feet (189 m) max

Lithology
- Primary: quartzite

Location
- Region: 1. Sierra Ancha range and locally. 2. central and southeast Arizona, below central Mogollon Rim region, and south, and southeastwards, in broken faulted mountains, or mountain flanks.
- Extent: central Arizona transition zone-(Sierra Ancha range, Globe, Arizona region, and south to Catalina Mountains, northeast regions

The Mesoproterozoic Dripping Spring Quartzite is a resistant, purple quartzite formation found in central and southeast Arizona, USA. It is a cliff-forming purplish unit found in the lower sections of the Apache Group, units of originally sedimentary layers, but later metamorphosed. The Apache Group is coeval with a similar aged Proterozoic sequence of eight geologic units found in the lowest geologic sequences of the Grand Canyon, the Grand Canyon Supergroup.

The Apache Group, or some underlying Vishnu Basement Rocks (Ruin Granite), are prominently found in all of the Sierra Ancha range, the range being separated by faults from its neighboring Mazatzal Mountains west, and the Salt River to the south. The Apache Group extends to regions east of the Sierra Ancha, and also regionally to Globe just south-southeast, and the neighboring Dripping Spring Mountains, again just south of the Globe region.

The Apache Group in descending order from youngest to oldest geologic units:

- D-Troy Quartzite
- C-Mescal Limestone
- B-Dripping Spring Quartzite
  - Barnes Conglomerate (Globe, Arizona region, lowest of Dripping Spring Q.)
- A-Pioneer Shale
  - Scanlon Conglomerate (lowest of Pioneer Shale)
