= Graphic texture =

Texture in igneous rocks

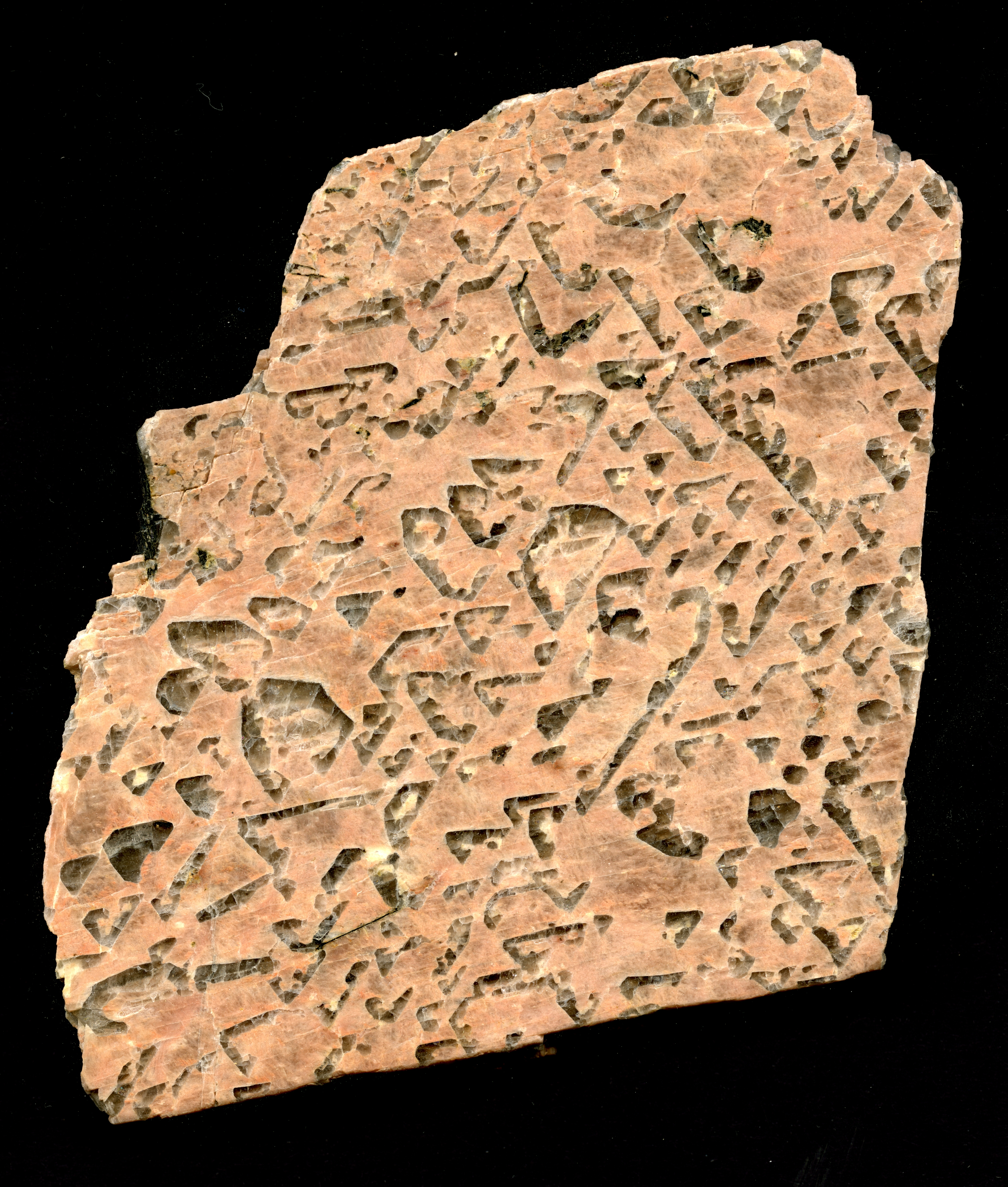
Graphic granite from the Einerkilen uranium mine in Evje, Norway

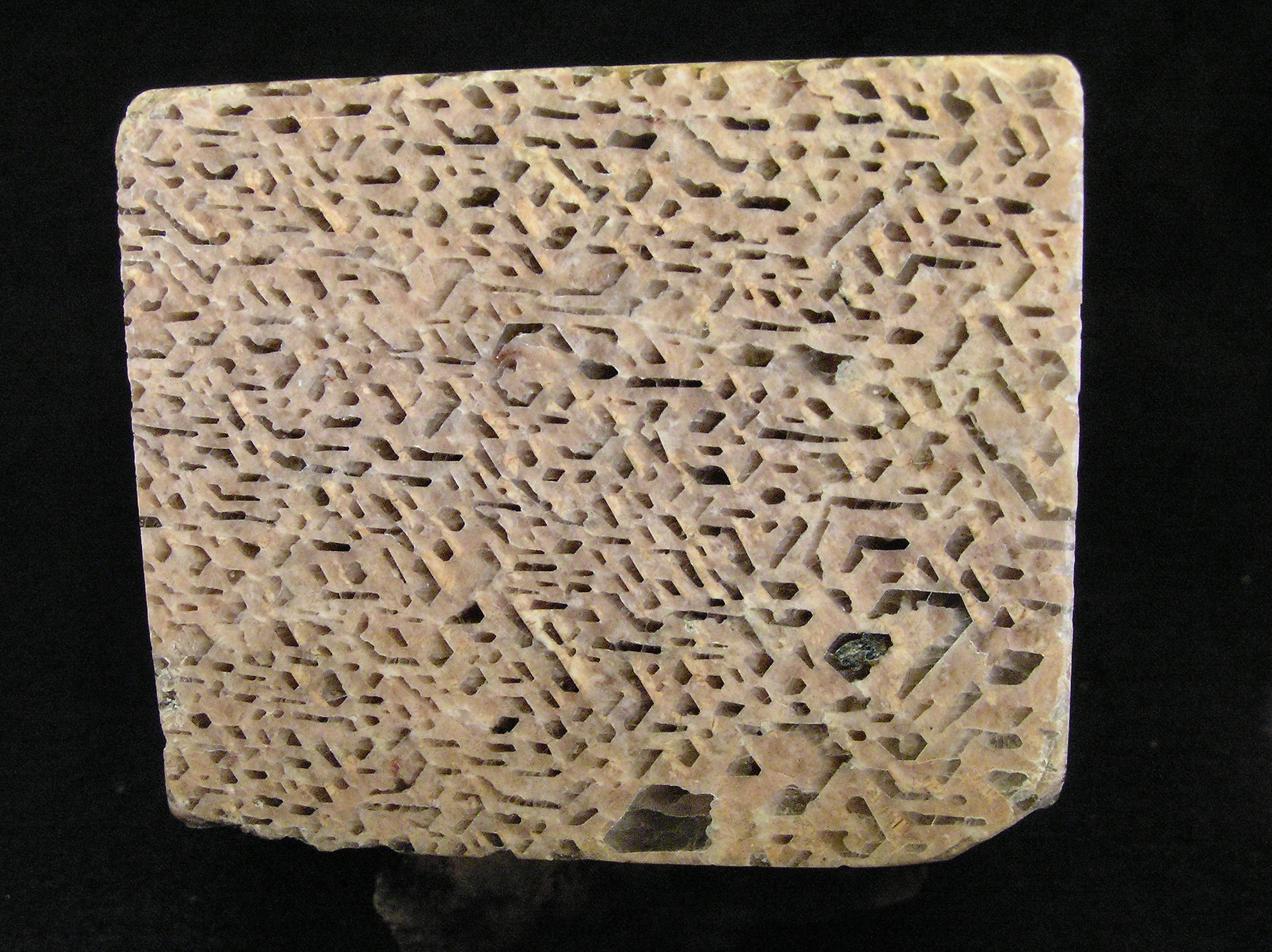
Graphic granite from the Einerkilen uranium mine in Evje, Norway

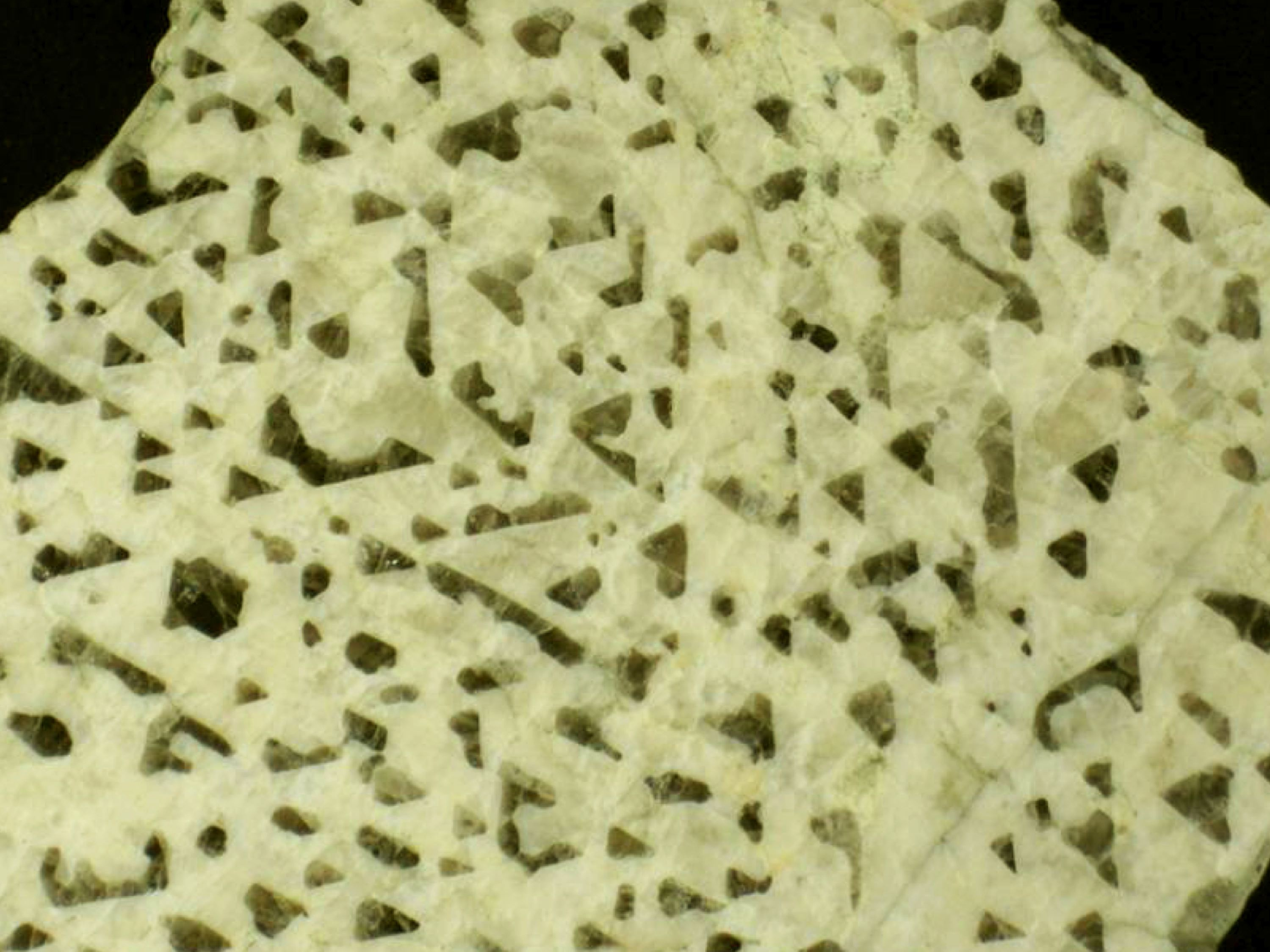
Graphic granite, southwestern Kola Peninsula, Russia

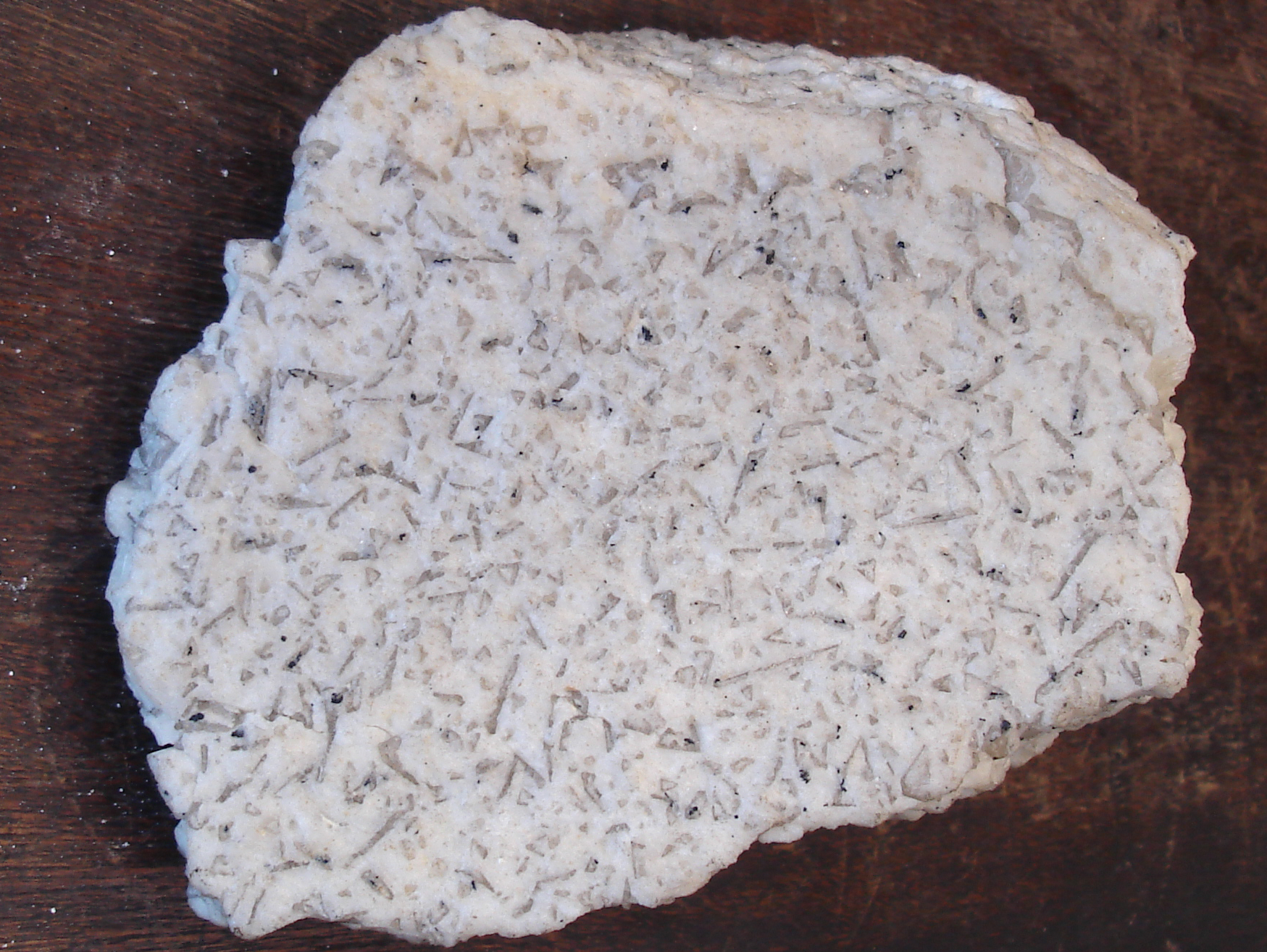
Graphic texture in a rock roughly 10x10 centimeters with feldspar (white) and quartz (gray, cuneiform)

Graphic texture is commonly created by exsolution and devitrification and immiscibility processes in igneous rocks. It is called 'graphic' because the exsolved or devitrified minerals form lines and shapes which are reminiscent of writing.

Graphic granite is a leucocratic granitic rock consisting of alkali feldspar with exsolved quartz typically forming a distinctive repetitive pattern sometimes resembling cuneiform or Arabic writing. Experiments have shown that graphic granite texture is derived from large single crystals of quartz and feldspar interleaving to create the cuneiform illusion.

Exsolved magnetite has graphic texture, as do some exsolution textures of pyroxene, pyrite feldspar and rarely other minerals.

== See also ==
- List of rock textures
- Rock microstructure § Graphic and other intergrowth textures
- Peperite
