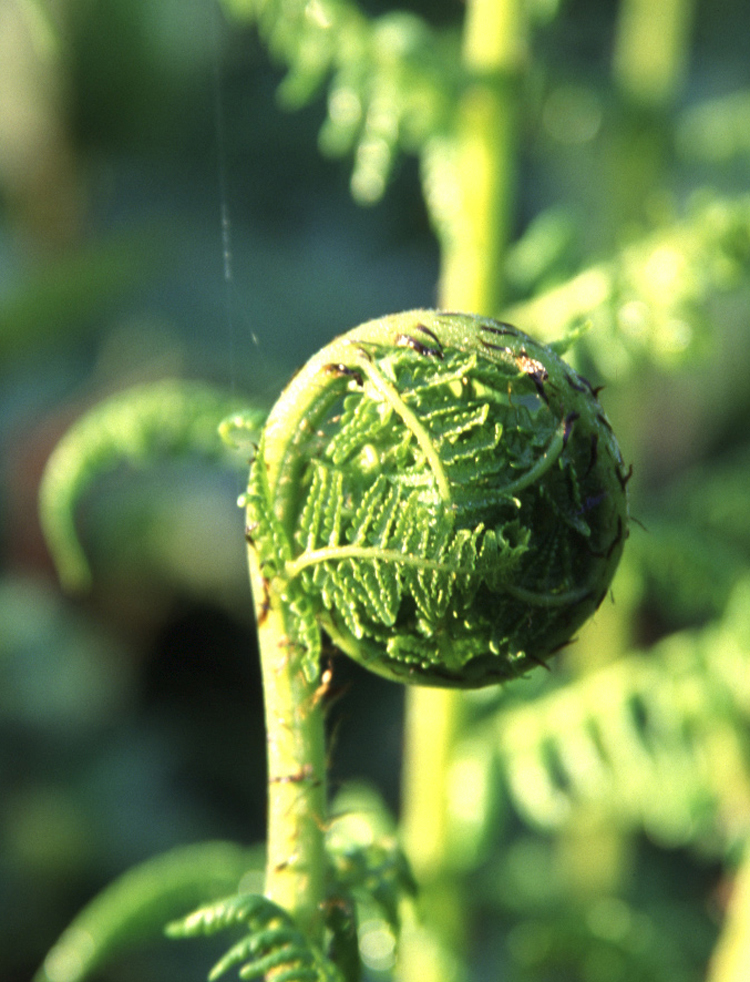

Conservation status
- Secure (NatureServe)

Scientific classification
- Kingdom: Plantae
- Clade: Tracheophytes
- Division: Polypodiophyta
- Class: Polypodiopsida
- Order: Polypodiales
- Suborder: Polypodiineae
- Family: Dryopteridaceae
- Genus: Dryopteris
- Species: D. arguta

Binomial name
- Dryopteris arguta (Kaulf.) Watt

= Dryopteris arguta =

Species of fern

Dryopteris arguta, with the common name coastal woodfern, is a species of wood fern. It is native to the west coast and western interior mountain ranges of North America, from British Columbia, throughout California, and into Arizona.

It grows between sea level and 6,000 feet (1,800 m). It is found in mixed evergreen forests, oak woodlands, and shady lower elevation slopes in chaparral and woodlands habitats.

== Description ==
Dryopteris arguta is somewhat variable in appearance. Leaflets sometimes turn at an angle from the leaf, giving it a ruffled or lacy look, and the toothed leaflets may have bristles at their tips. According to C. Michael Hogan, the thin concave indusia are quite closely spaced and almost entirely cover the sporangia.

== Gallery ==
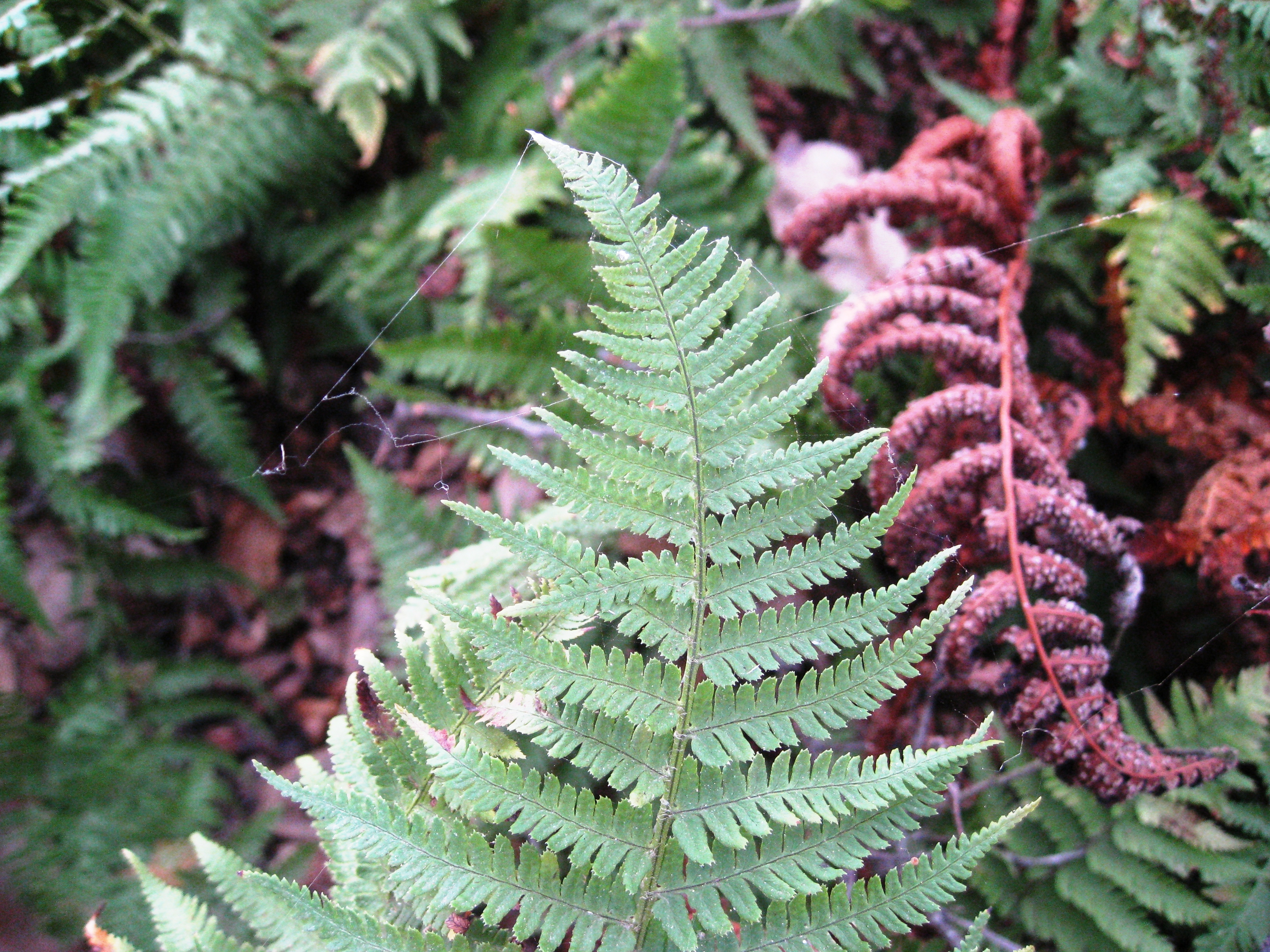
Dryopteris arguta at the Santa Barbara Botanic Garden

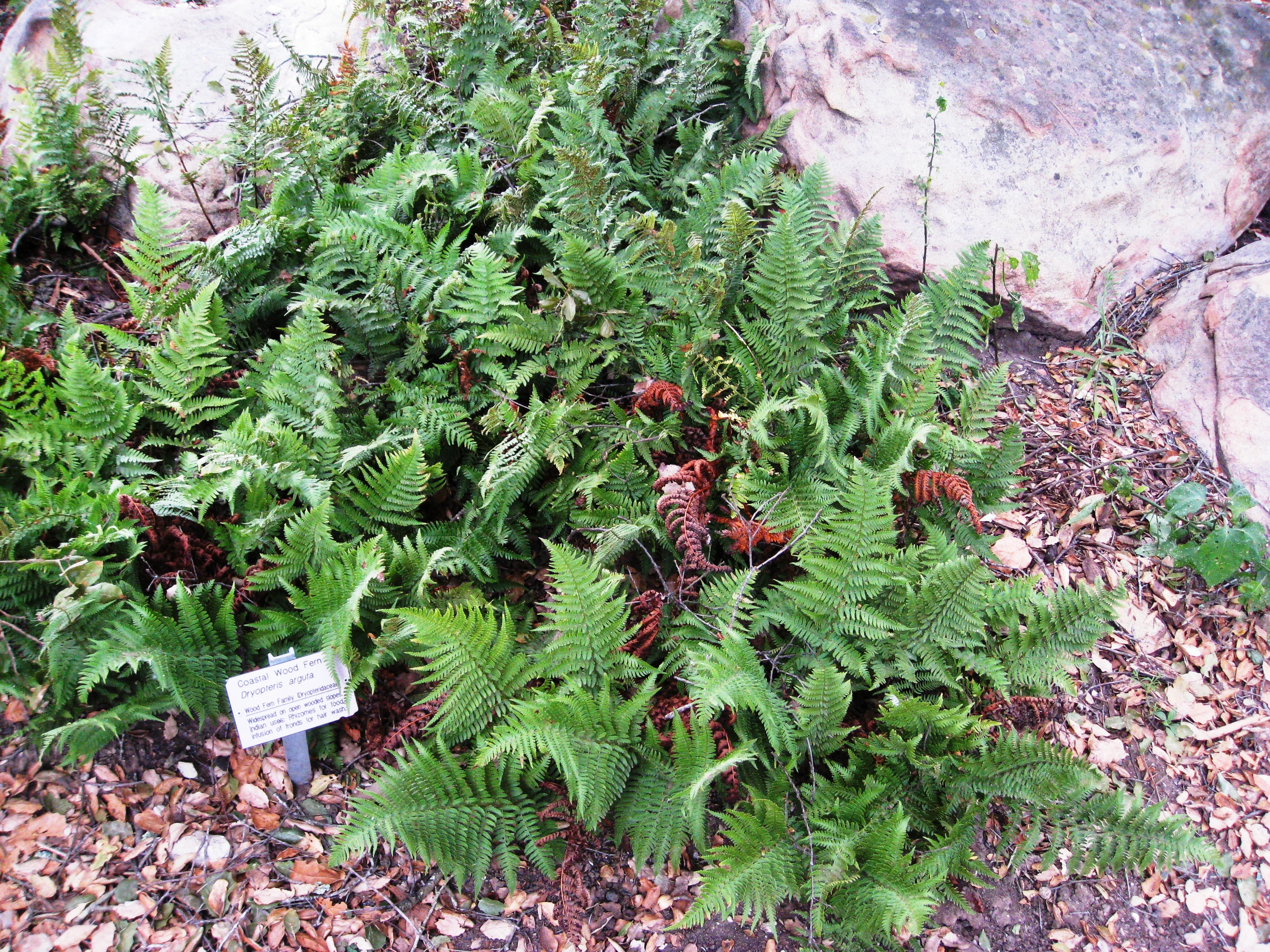
Bed of ferns

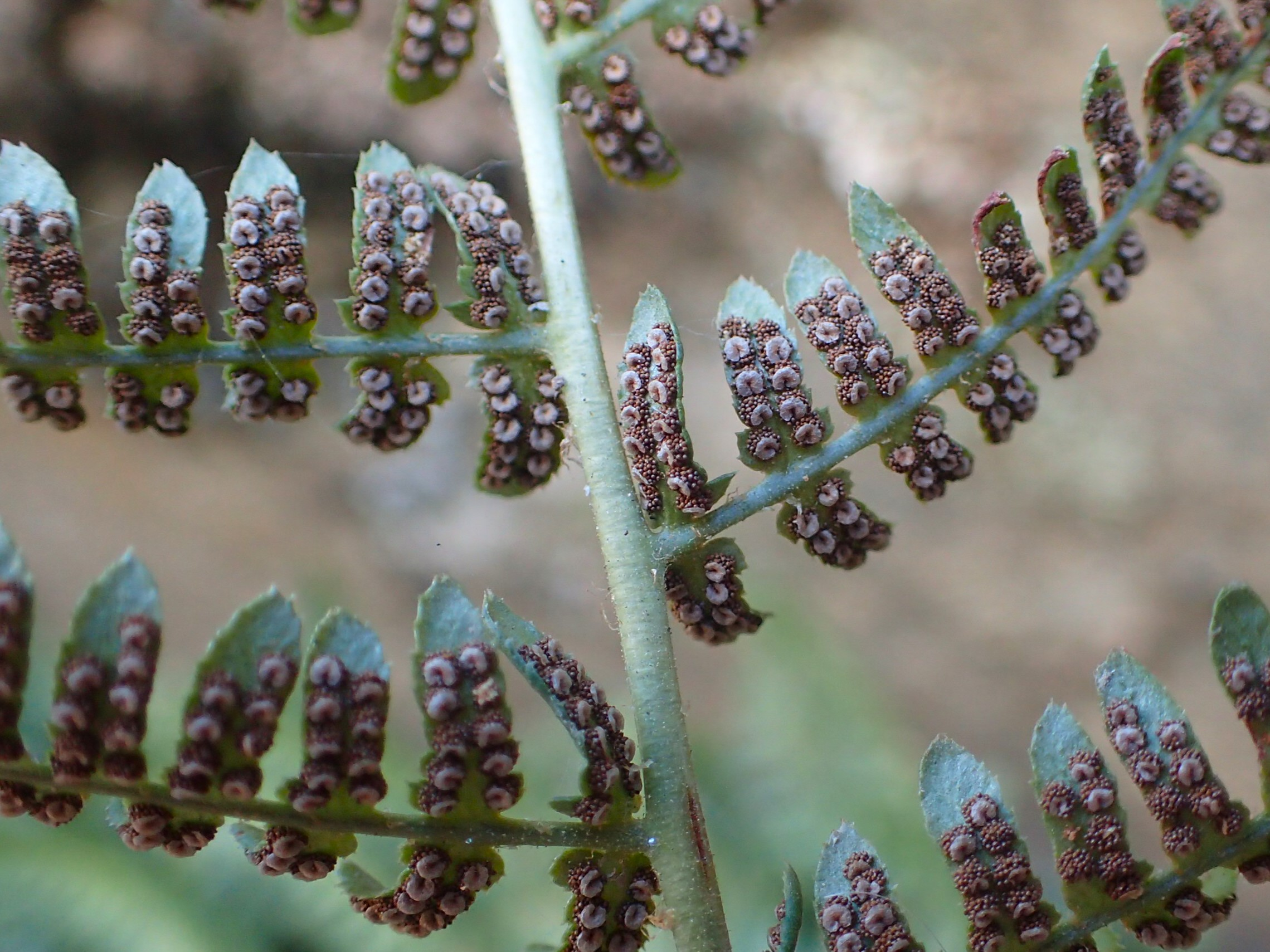
Spores on the underside of the leaf

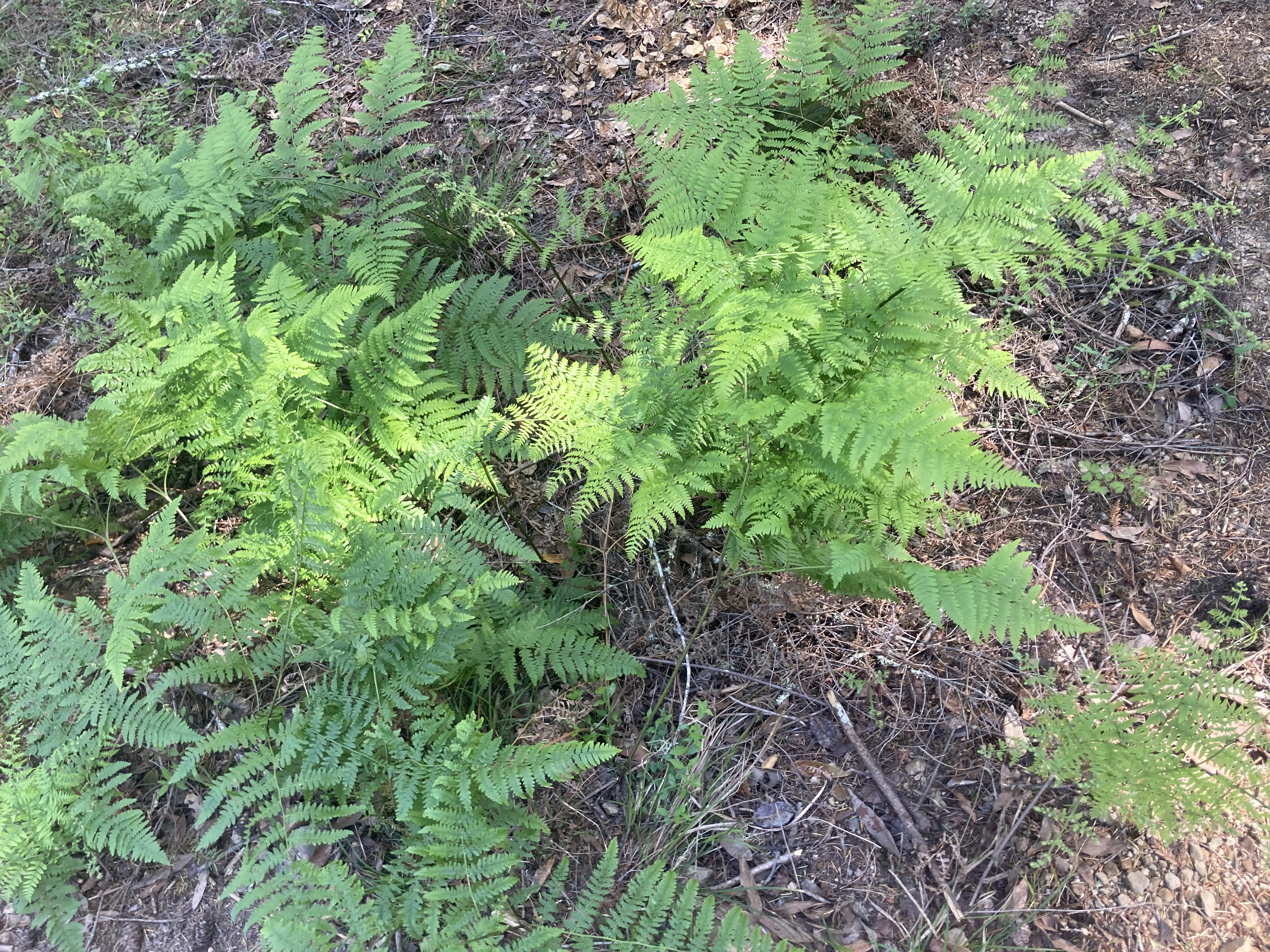
Dryopteris arguta in Sonoma.

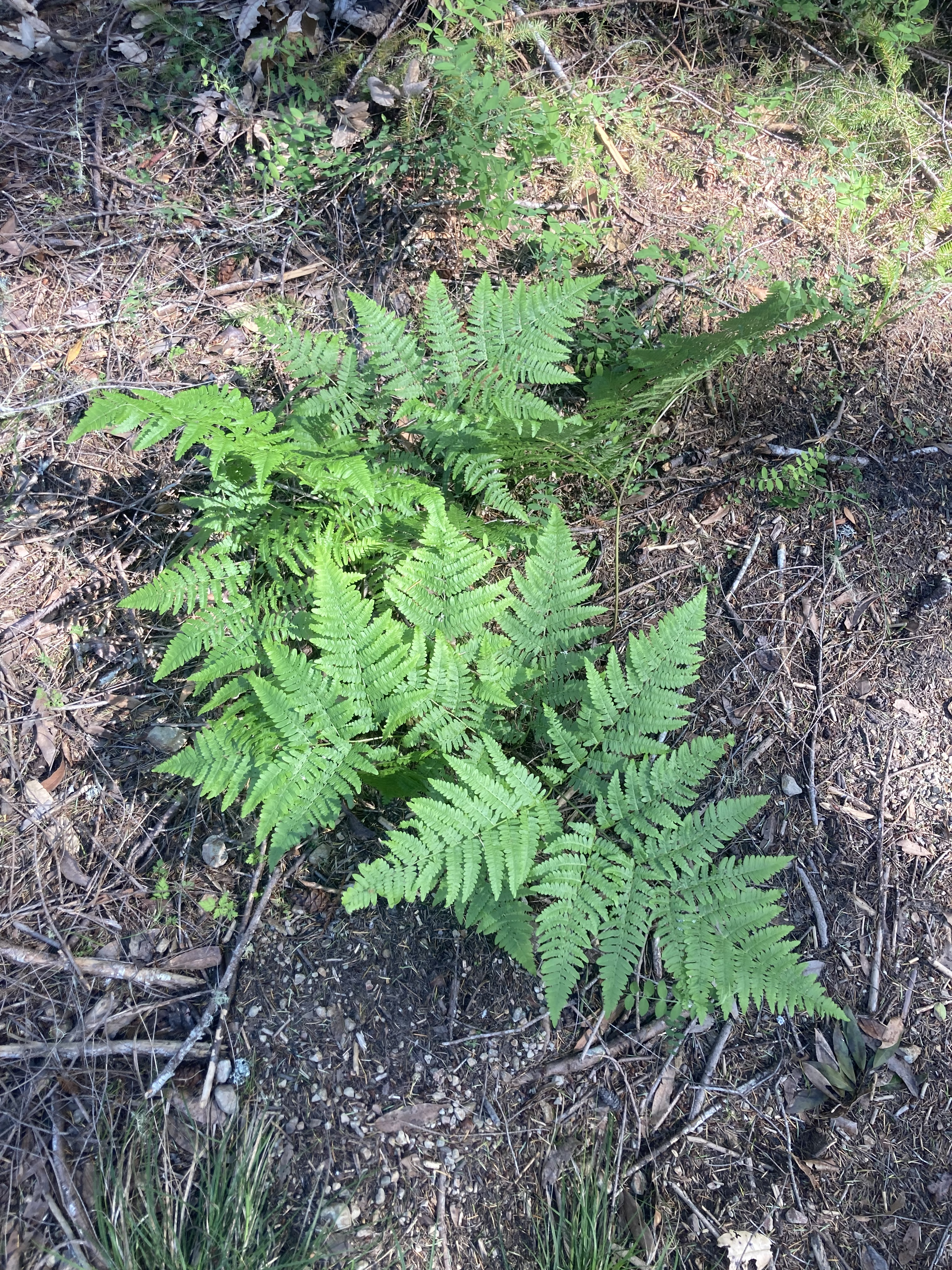
Dryopteris arguta at Armstrong Redwoods.
