= Electric Peak (San Juan Mountains) =

Mountain in Colorado United States

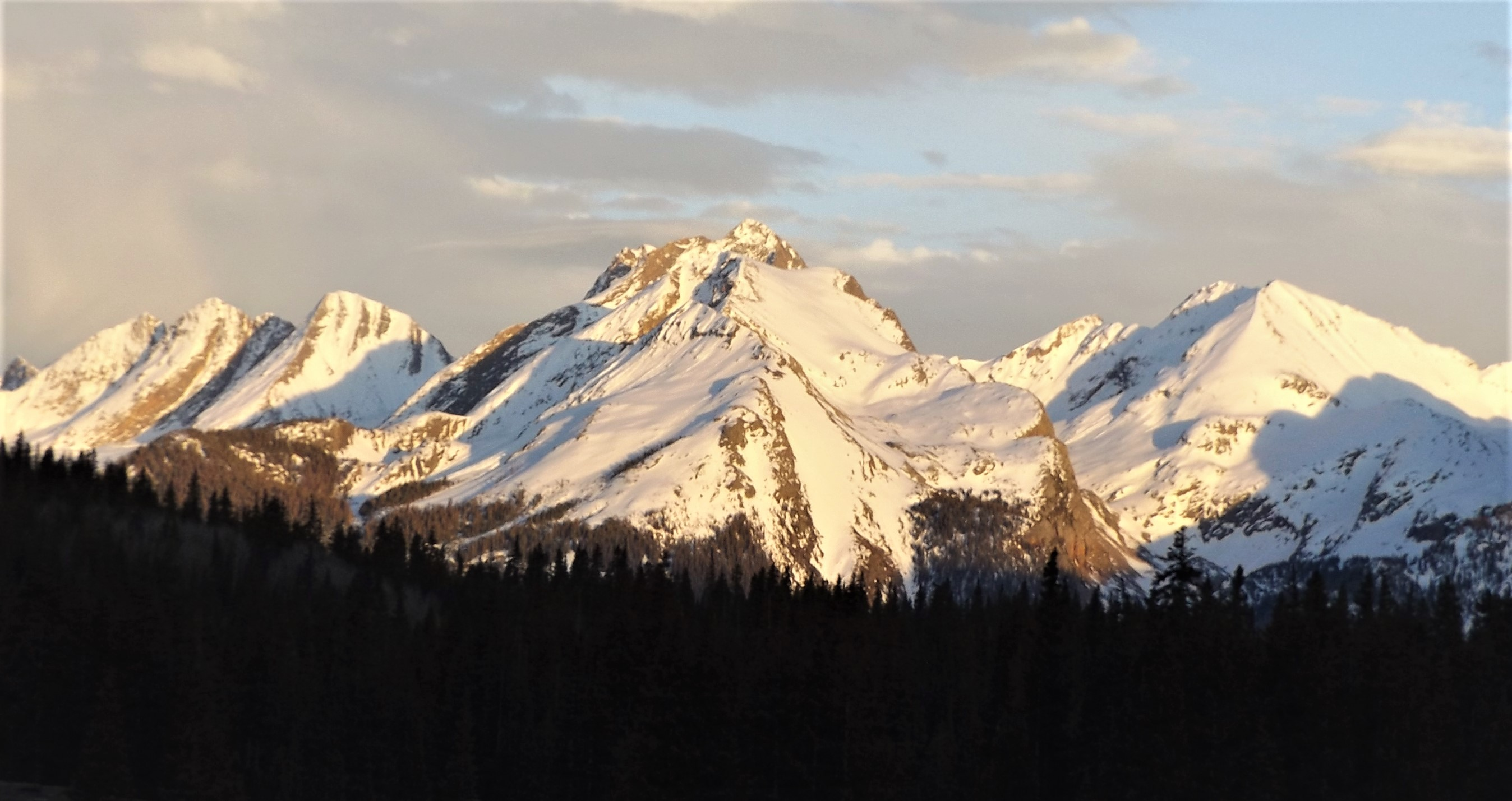
- Northwest aspect centered (Top of Arrow Peak visible directly behind Electric. Trinity Peaks to left, Graystone Peak to right.)

Highest point
- Elevation: 13,292 ft (4,051 m)
- Prominence: 812 ft (247 m)
- Parent peak: Graystone Peak (13,489 ft)
- Isolation: 0.58 mi (0.93 km)
- Coordinates: 37°41′56″N 107°37′02″W

Geography
- Location within Colorado Location within the United States
- Location: San Juan County, Colorado, US
- Parent range: Rocky Mountains; San Juan Mountains; Needle Mountains
- Topo map: USGS Storm King Peak

Geology
- Rock age: Statherian
- Mountain type: Intrusive
- Rock type: Quartzite

Climbing
- Easiest route: class 2 South Face

Electric Peak is a 13,292-foot-elevation (4,051-meter) mountain summit located in San Juan County, Colorado, United States. It is situated eight miles south of the community of Silverton, in the Weminuche Wilderness, on land managed by San Juan National Forest. It is part of the Needle Mountains which are a subset of the San Juan Mountains, which in turn is a subset of the Rocky Mountains. Precipitation runoff from the mountain drains into tributaries of the Animas River. The peak can be seen from U.S. Route 550 and the Durango and Silverton Narrow Gauge Railroad. Topographic relief is significant as the west aspect rises over 4,500 feet (1,400 meters) above the river and railway in approximately two miles. It is set five miles west of the Continental Divide, and one mile east of Mount Garfield. The mountain's name, which has been officially adopted by the United States Board on Geographic Names, was in use before 1906 when Henry Gannett published it in the Gazetteer of Colorado.

== Climate ==
According to the Köppen climate classification system, Electric Peak is located in an alpine subarctic climate zone with very long, cold, snowy winters, and cool to warm summers. Due to its altitude, it receives precipitation all year, as snow in winter, and as thunderstorms in summer, with a dry period in late spring.

== Geology ==
Electric Peak is part of the Uncompahgre Formation, which is a sequence of quartzite and black phyllite some 8,200 feet (2,500 meters) in thickness. The formation dates to the Statherian period and is interpreted as metamorphosed marine and fluvial sandstone, mudstone, and shale. The formation overlies plutons with an age of 1,707 million years.

== Gallery ==
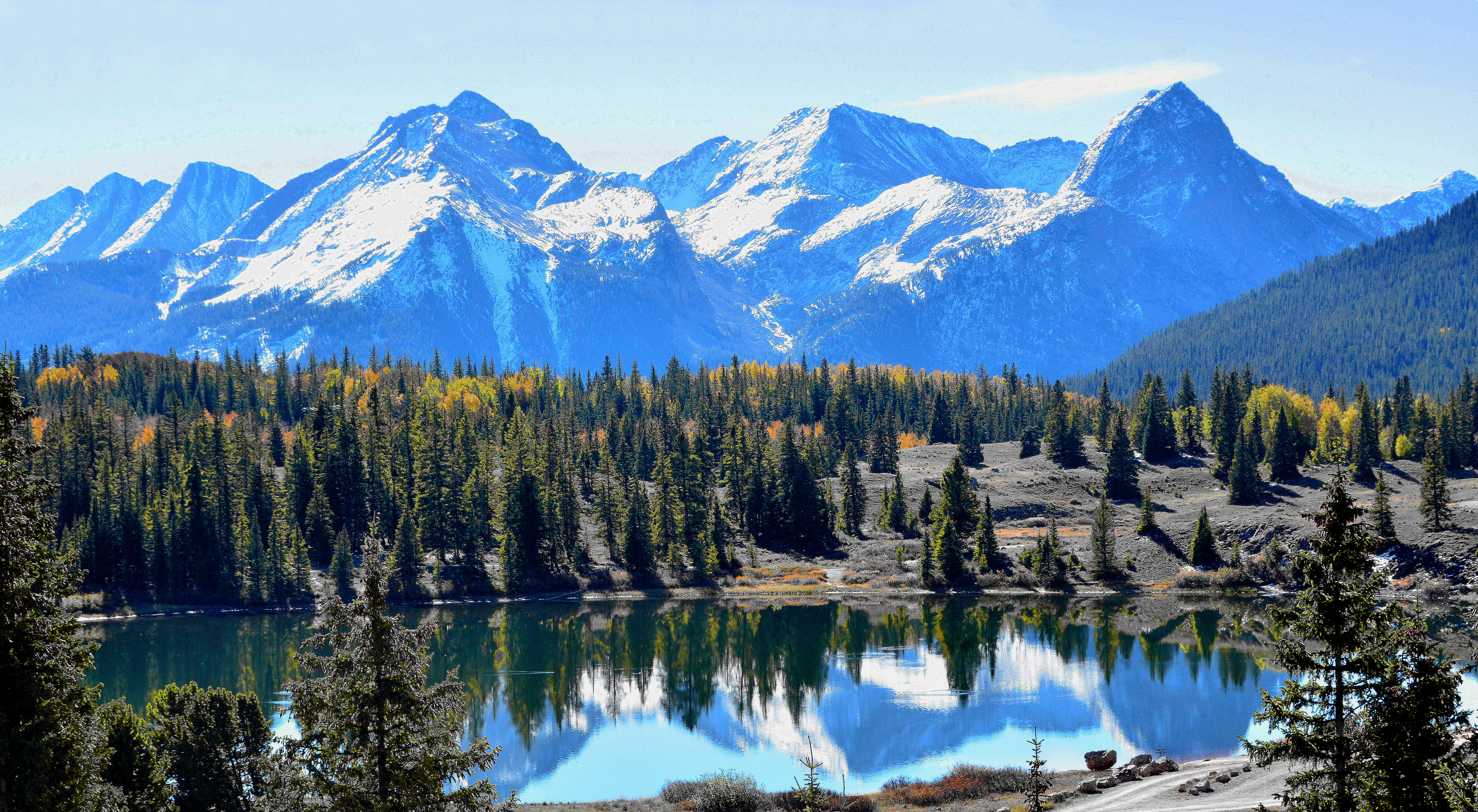
Electric Peak (left), Graystone Peak, Mt. Garfield (right) viewed from Molas Lake

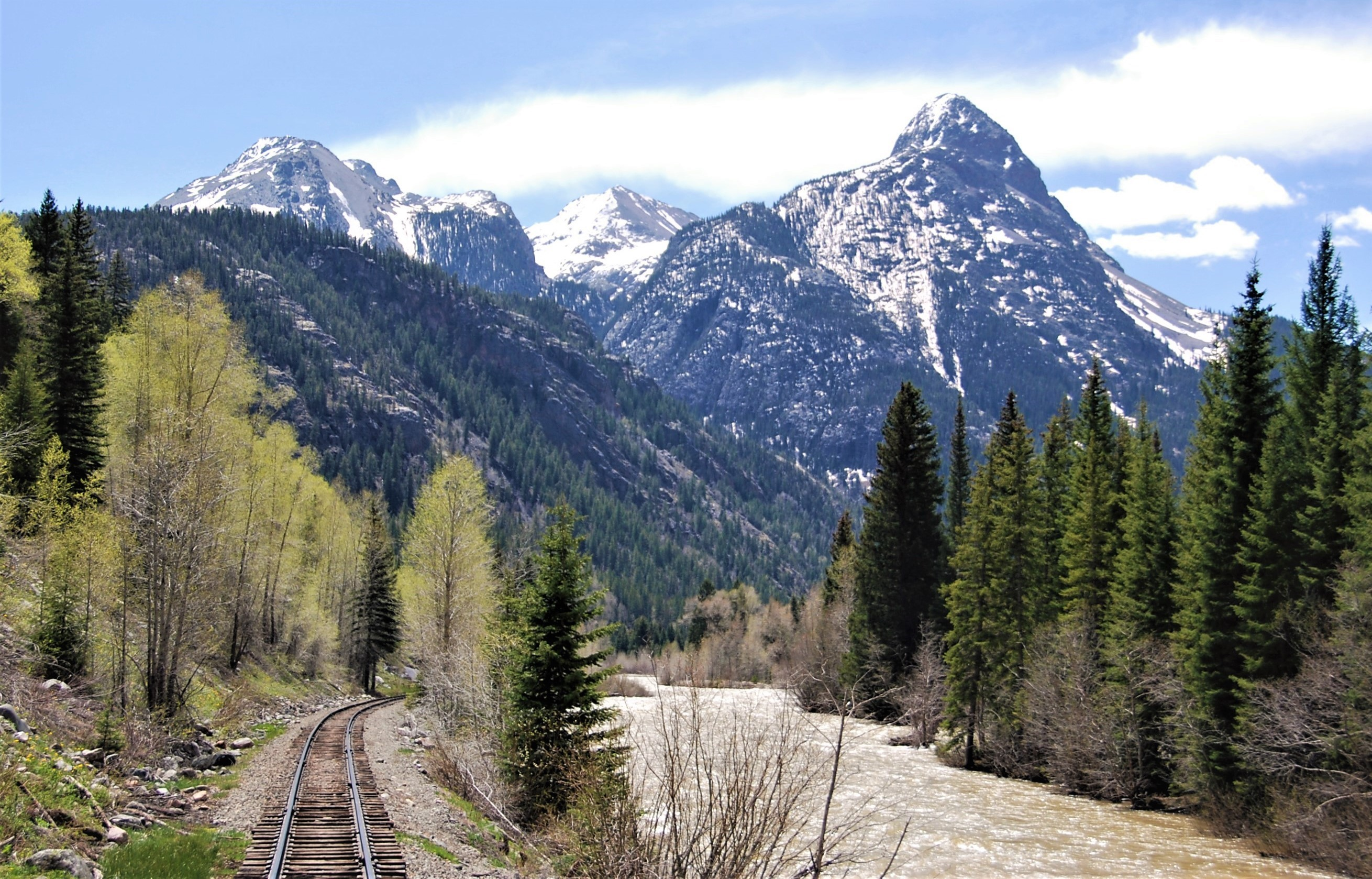
Electric Peak (left), Garfield (right) seen with Animas River from Durango and Silverton train

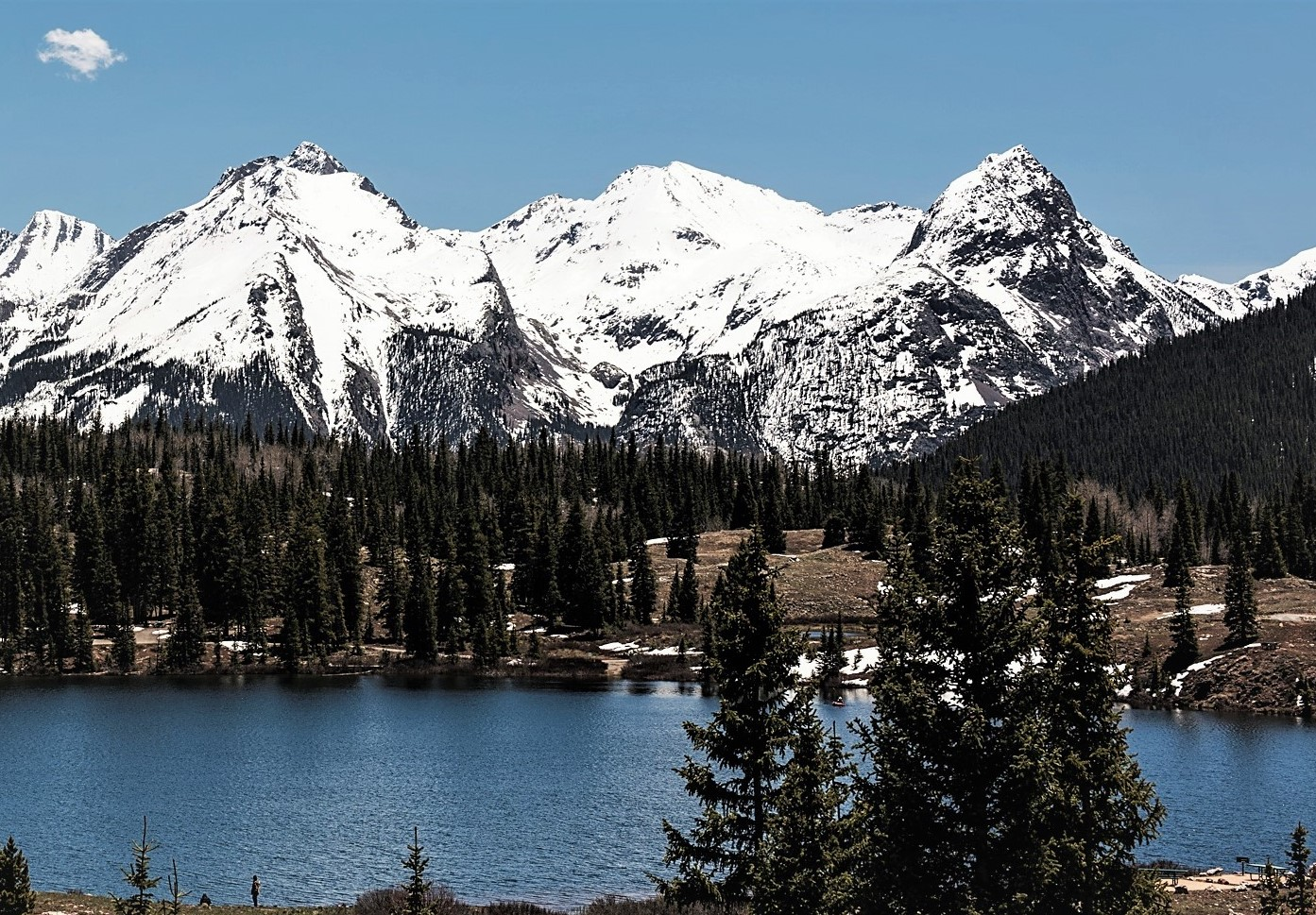
Electric Peak, Graystone Peak (center), Mt. Garfield (right) from Molas Lake

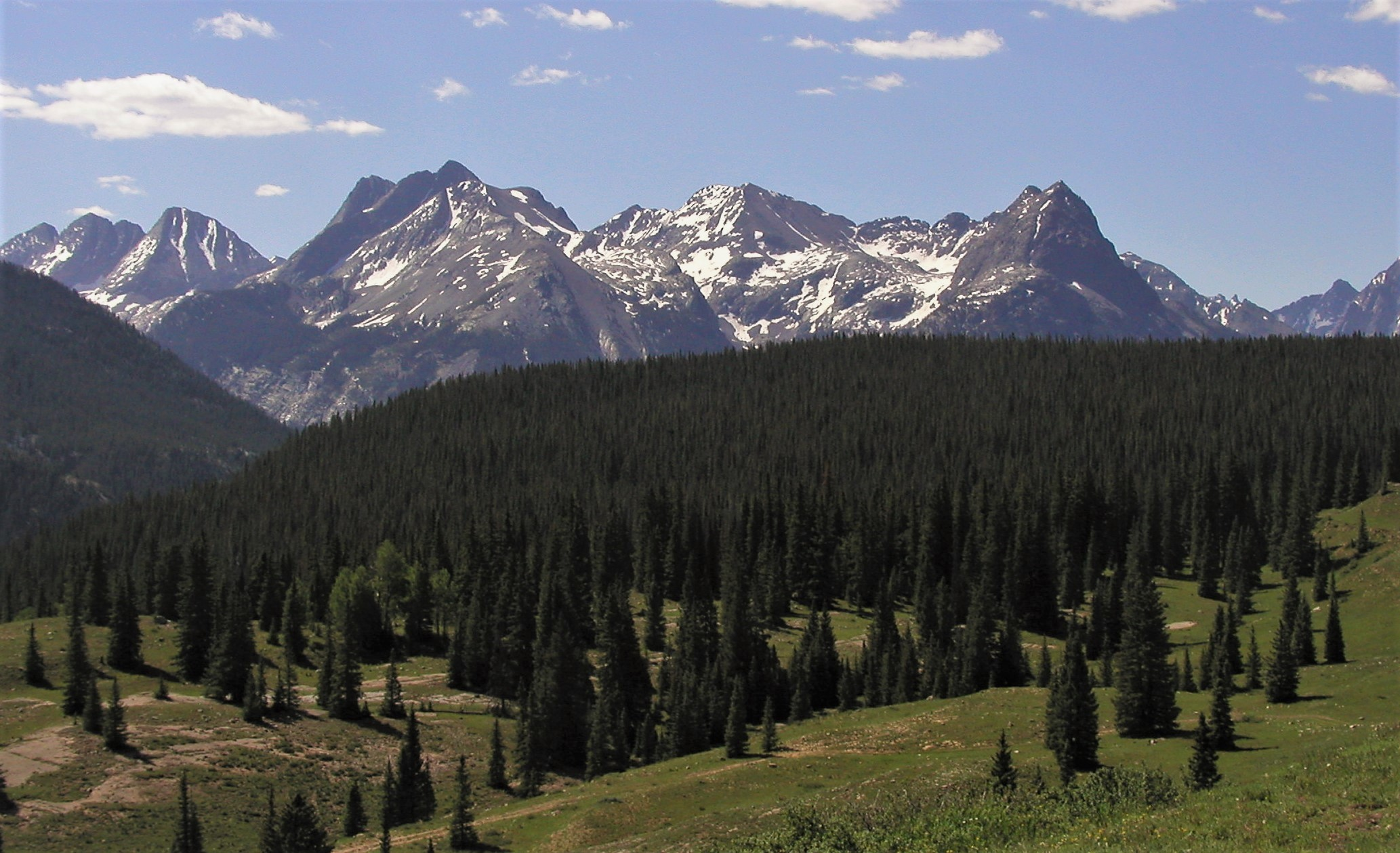
Electric Peak, Graystone Peak (center), Mt. Garfield (right)

== See also ==
- Thirteener
- Electric Peak (Sangre de Cristo)
