= Graystone Peak =

Mountain in the American state of Colorado

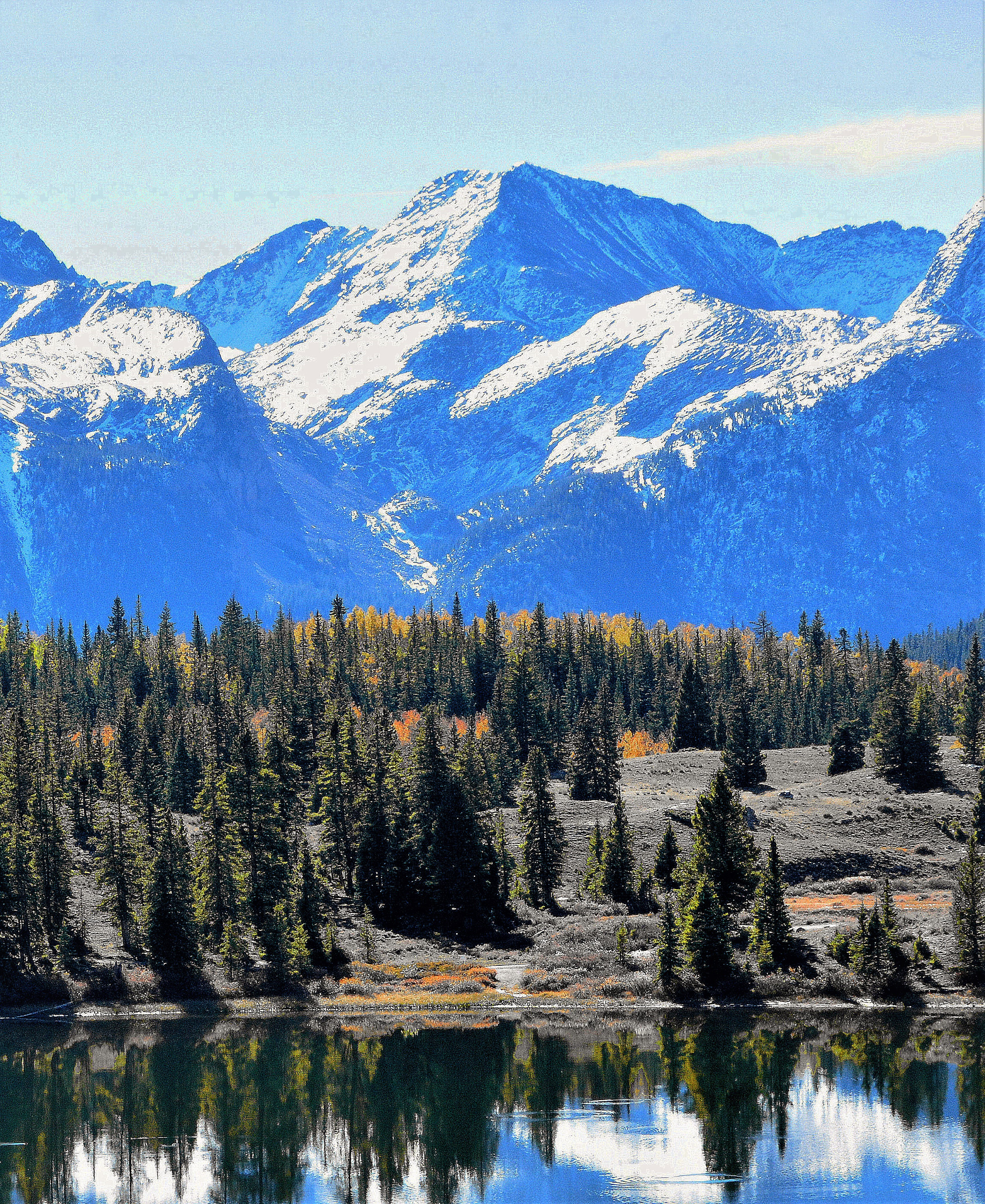
- Northwest aspect, from Molas Lake

Highest point
- Elevation: 13,489 ft (4,111 m)
- Prominence: 502 ft (153 m)
- Parent peak: Arrow Peak (13,809 ft)
- Isolation: 0.56 mi (0.90 km)
- Coordinates: 37°41′21″N 107°37′09″W

Geography
- Location within Colorado Location within the United States
- Country: United States
- State: Colorado
- County: San Juan County
- Protected area: Weminuche Wilderness
- Parent range: Rocky Mountains; San Juan Mountains; Needle Mountains
- Topo map: USGS Storm King Peak

Geology
- Rock age: Statherian
- Rock type: Quartzite

Climbing
- Easiest route: class 2 hiking

Graystone Peak is a 13,489-foot-elevation (4,111-meter) mountain summit located in San Juan County, Colorado, United States.

== Description ==
Graystone Peak is situated 8.5 miles (13.7 km) south-southeast of the community of Silverton in the Weminuche Wilderness, on land managed by San Juan National Forest. It is part of the Needle Mountains which are a subrange of the San Juan Mountains. Precipitation runoff from the mountain drains into tributaries of the Animas River. Topographic relief is significant as the summit rises 4,800 feet (1,500 meters) above the river in two miles (3.2 km) and 2,890 feet (880 meters) above Tenmile Creek in 0.85 mile (1.37 km). It is set six miles west of the Continental Divide, 0.7 mile south of Electric Peak, and one mile east-southeast of Mount Garfield. These three peaks can be seen from U.S. Route 550 at Molas Lake. The mountain's toponym has been officially adopted by the United States Board on Geographic Names, and was recorded in publications as early as 1906.

== Climate ==
According to the Köppen climate classification system, Graystone Peak is located in an alpine subarctic climate zone with very long, cold, snowy winters, and cool to warm summers. Due to its altitude, it receives precipitation all year, as snow in winter and as thunderstorms in summer, with a dry period in late spring.

== Geology ==
Graystone Peak is part of the Uncompahgre Formation, which is a sequence of quartzite and black phyllite some 8,200 feet (2,500 meters) in thickness. The formation dates to the Statherian period and is interpreted as metamorphosed marine and fluvial sandstone, mudstone, and shale. The formation overlies plutons with an age of 1,707 million years.

== Gallery ==
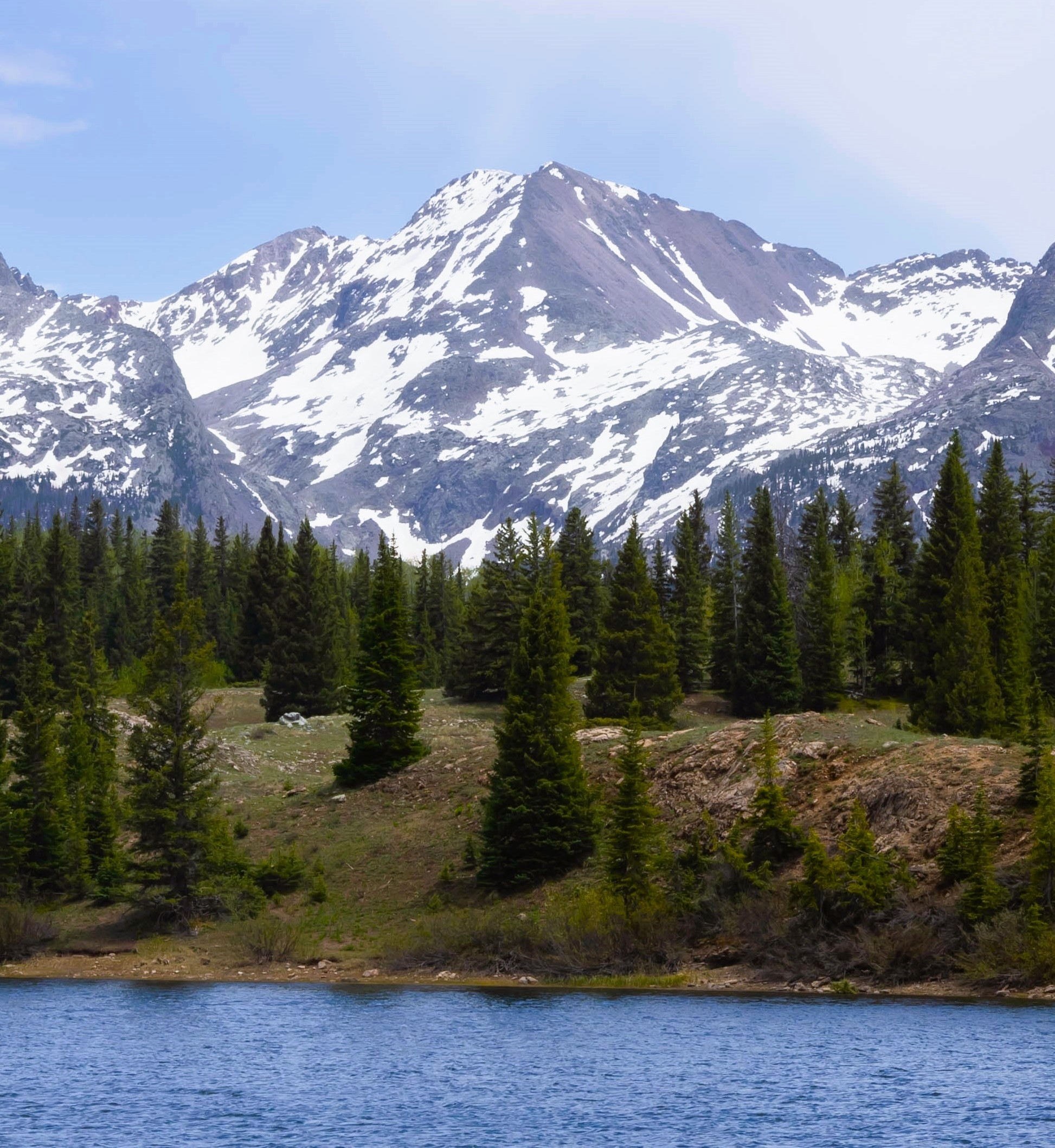
Northwest aspect viewed from Molas Lake

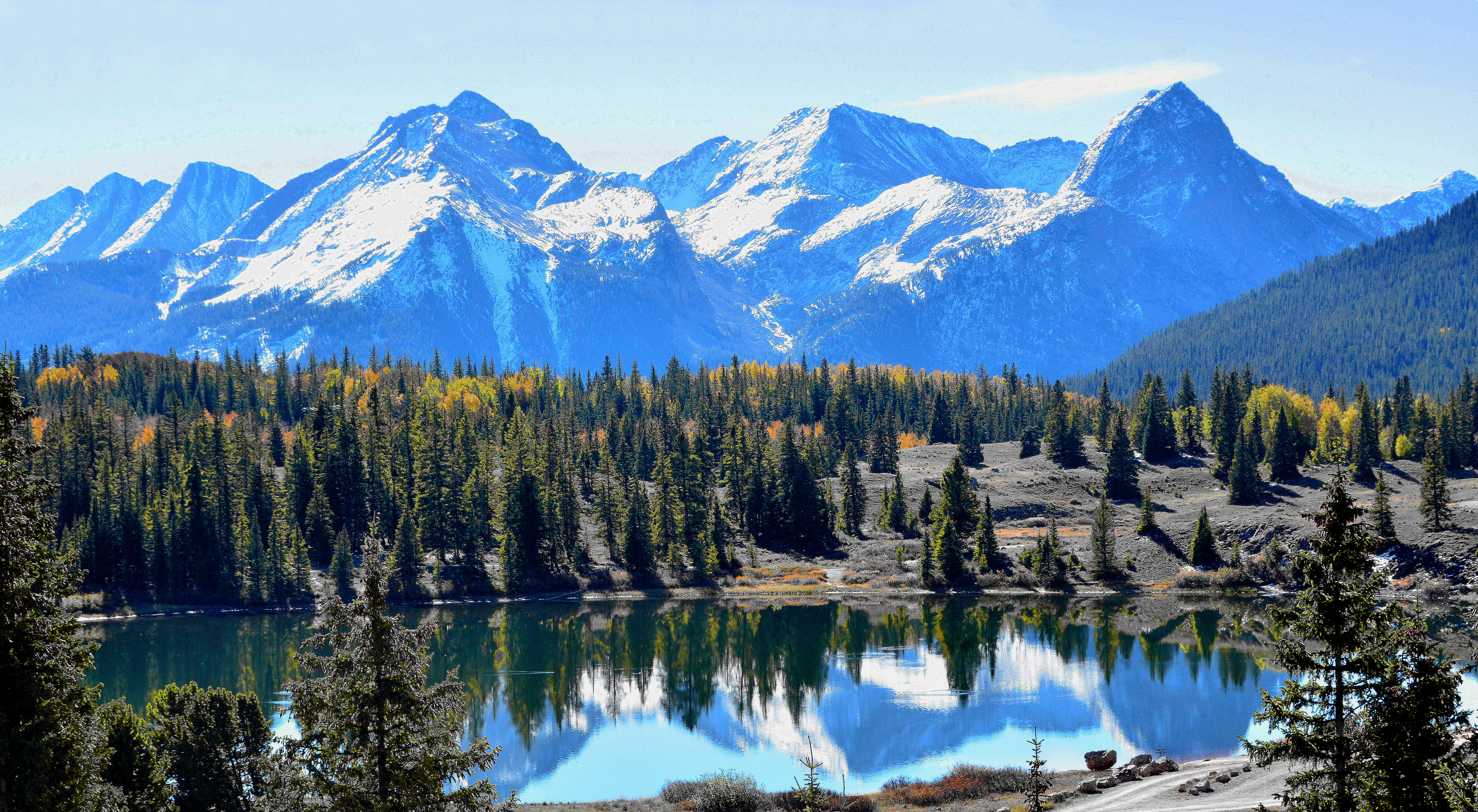
Electric Peak, Graystone Peak (center), Mt. Garfield (right) viewed from Molas Lake

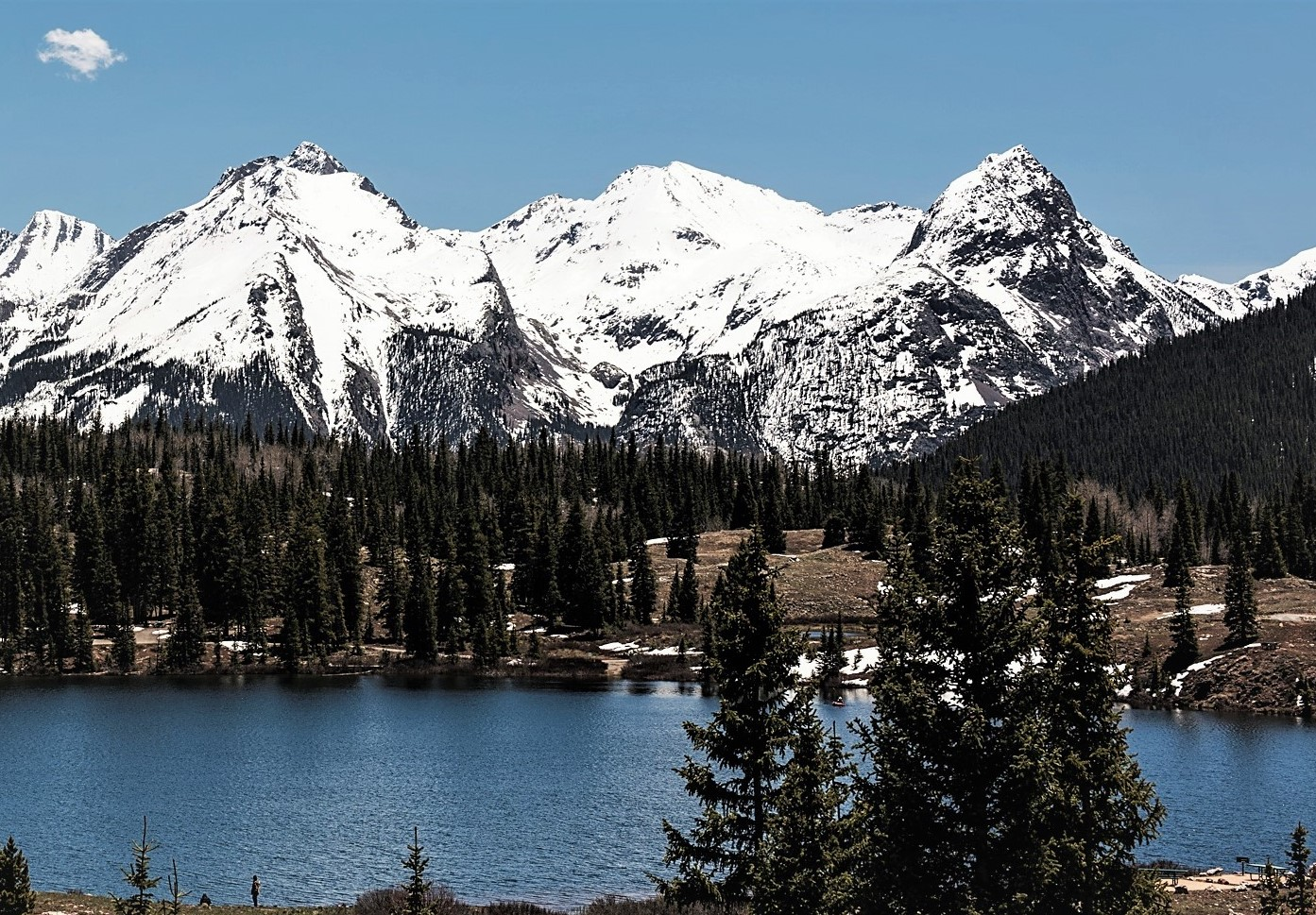
Electric Peak, Graystone Peak (center), Mt. Garfield (right) from Molas Lake

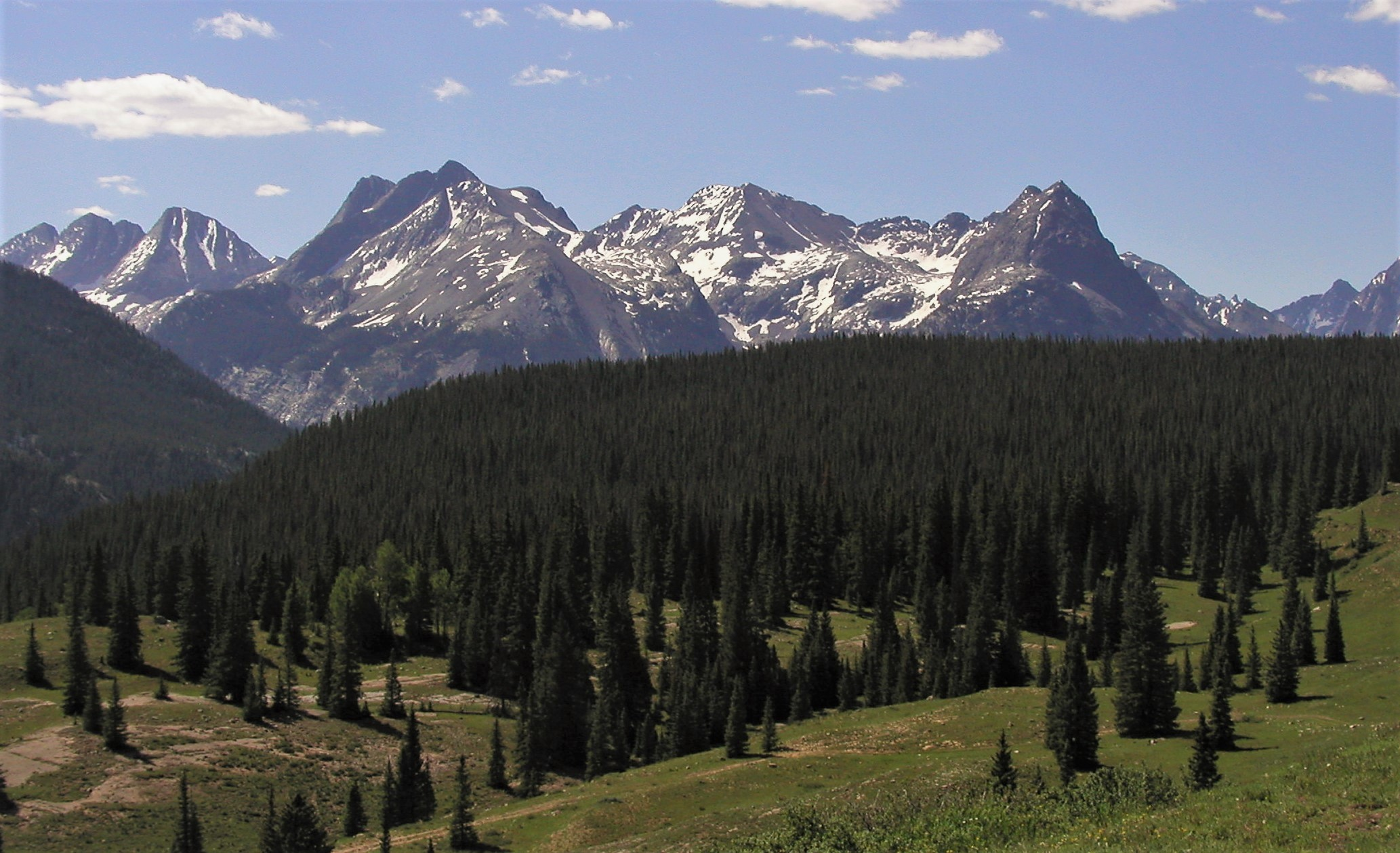
Electric Peak, Graystone Peak (center), Mt. Garfield (right)

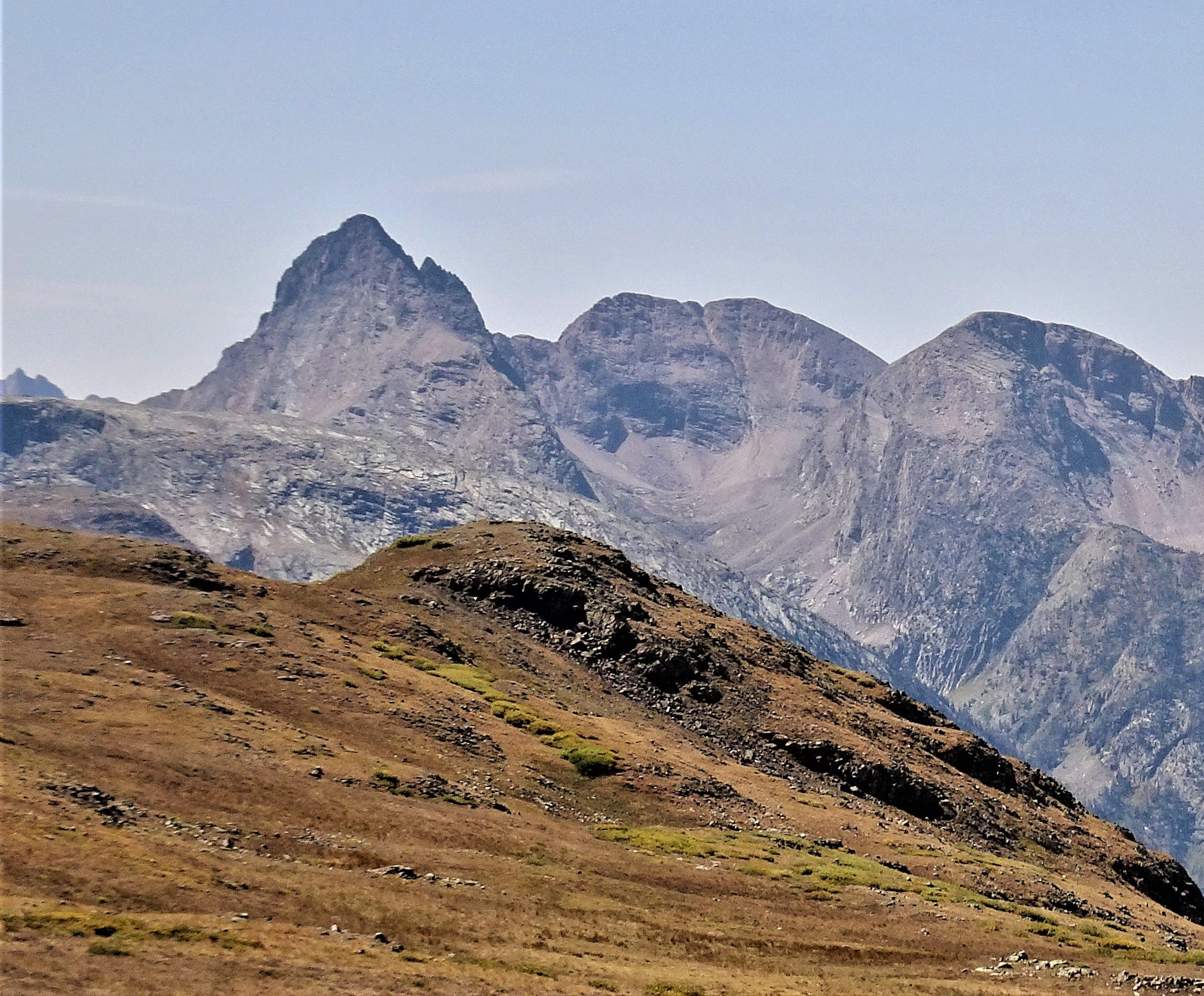
Northeast aspect of Arrow Peak to left, Graystone Peak centered and Electric Peak to right

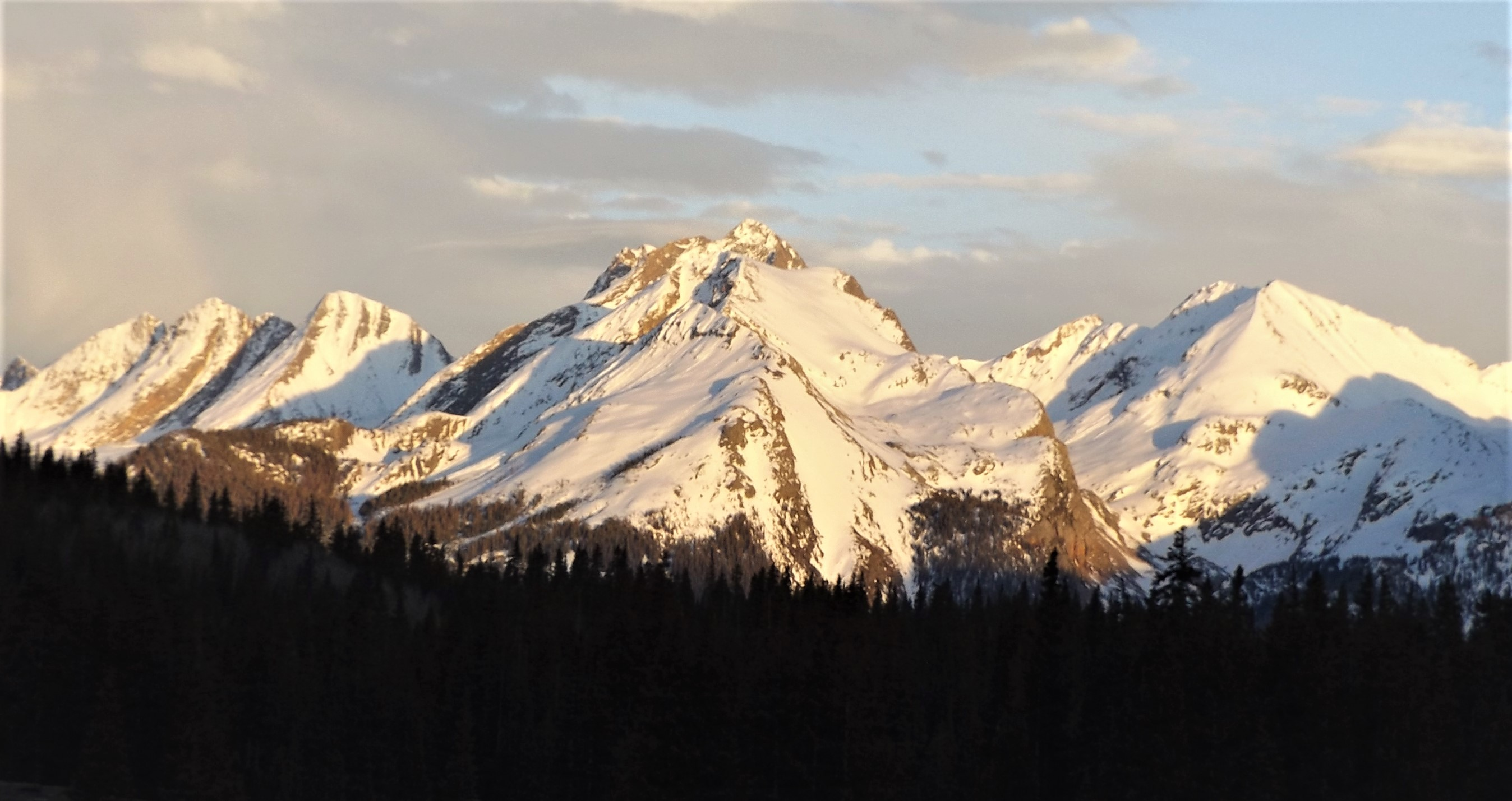
Graystone Peak to the right

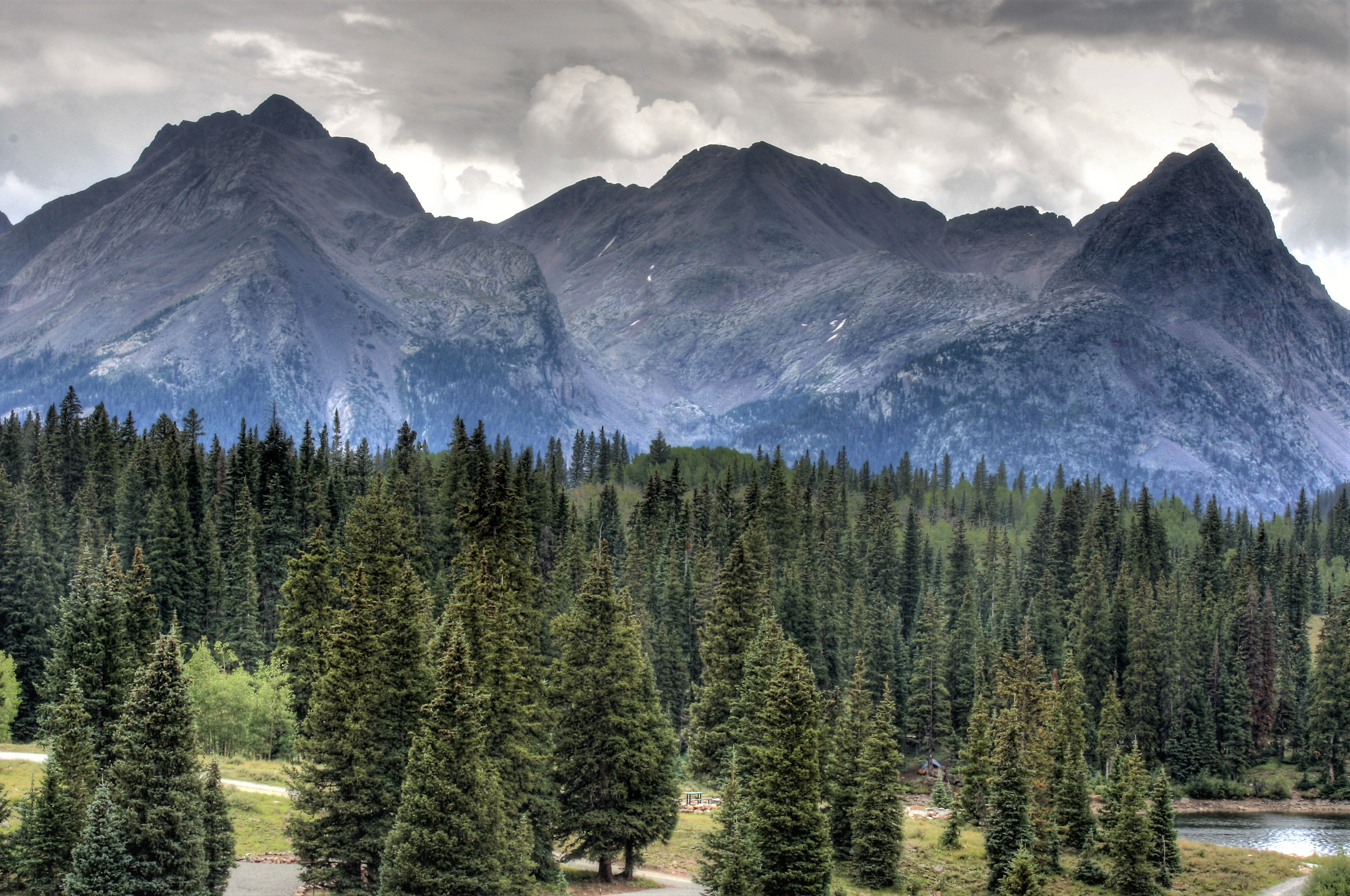
Graystone Peak centered

== See also ==
- Thirteener
