= Arrow Peak =

Mountain in the state of Colorado

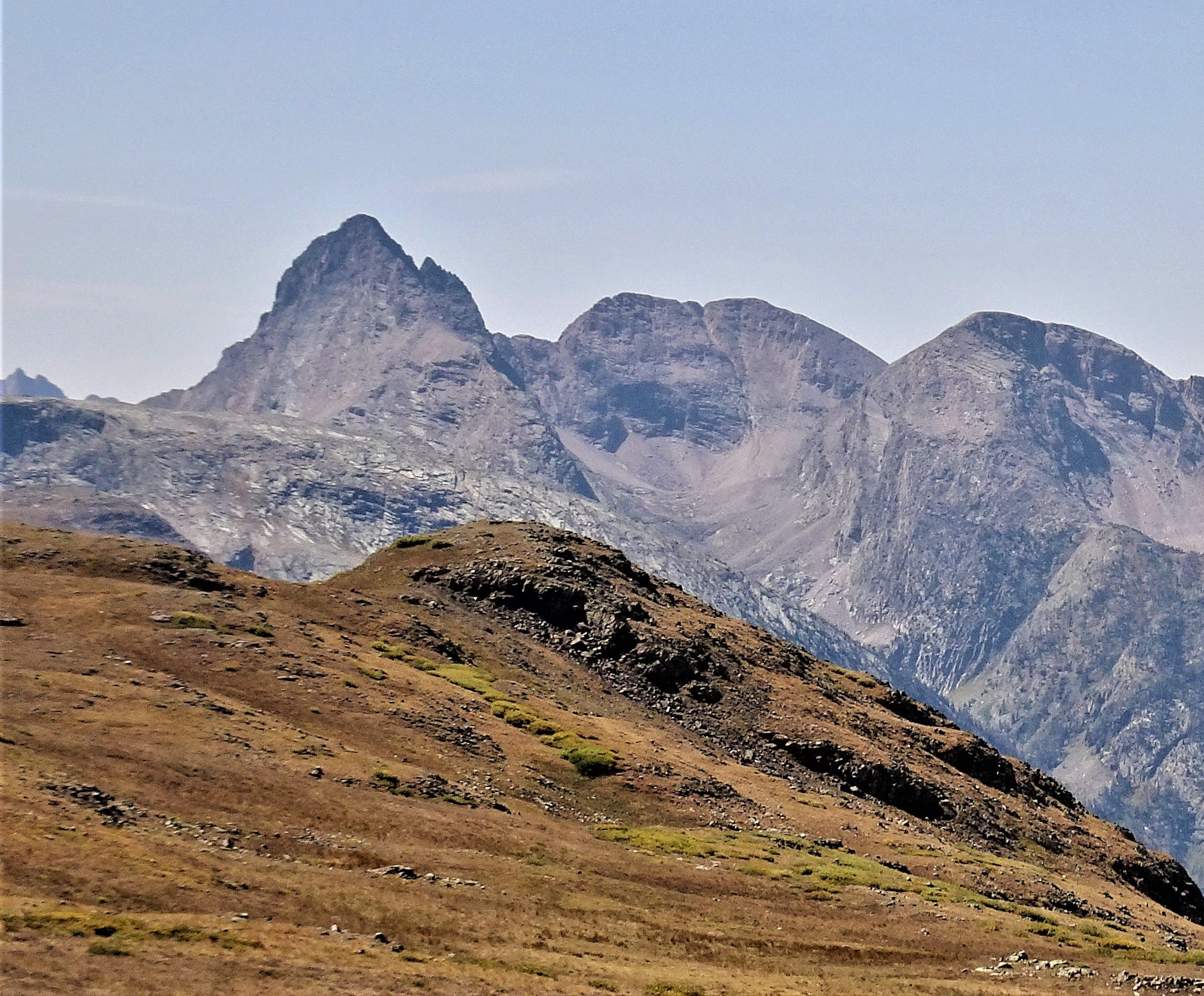
- Northeast aspect of Arrow Peak to left (Graystone Peak and Electric Peak to right)

Highest point
- Elevation: 13,809 ft (4,209 m)
- Prominence: 943 ft (287 m)
- Isolation: 0.48 mi (0.77 km)
- Coordinates: 37°41′34″N 107°36′36″W

Geography
- Location within Colorado
- Location: San Juan County, Colorado, U.S.
- Parent range: San Juan Mountains, Needle Mountains, Grenadier Range
- Topo map(s): USGS 7.5' topographic map Storm King Peak, Colorado

Arrow Peak is a high mountain summit in the Grenadier Range of the Rocky Mountains of North America. The 13,809-foot (4,209 m) thirteener is located in the Weminuche Wilderness of San Juan National Forest, 8.7 miles (14.0 km) south-southeast (bearing 160°) of the Town of Silverton in San Juan County, Colorado, United States.

== Mountain ==
Arrow Peak ranks 123rd among the highest mountains in Colorado and 182nd in the whole of the United States. Some of the peaks nearest to it are: Vestal Peak, Graystone Peak, Electric Peak, Point Pun, West Trinity, and Mount Garfield.

Arrow Peak falls under the Grenadier Range of San Juan Mountains. Given its rocky face, Arrow Peak, like other peaks of the Grenadier Range, offers one of the best mountaineering adventures in Colorado. History has it that the first Americans to scale Arrow Peak were William Cooper and John Hubbard in 1908, which was followed by a second ascent in 1932 by Carleton Long and John Nelson via a more arduous route called the Greystone-Arrow saddle.

Arrow Peak and its neighboring, peaks, especially Vestal Peak, all formed from the metamorphic rock quartzite, are considered hard climbs, Arrow Peak ranking as the toughest before a new route was found.

== See also ==
- List of Colorado mountain ranges
- List of Colorado mountain summits
  - List of Colorado fourteeners
  - List of Colorado 4000 meter prominent summits
  - List of the most prominent summits of Colorado
- List of Colorado county high points
