= Snowdon Peak =

Mountain in Colorado, United States

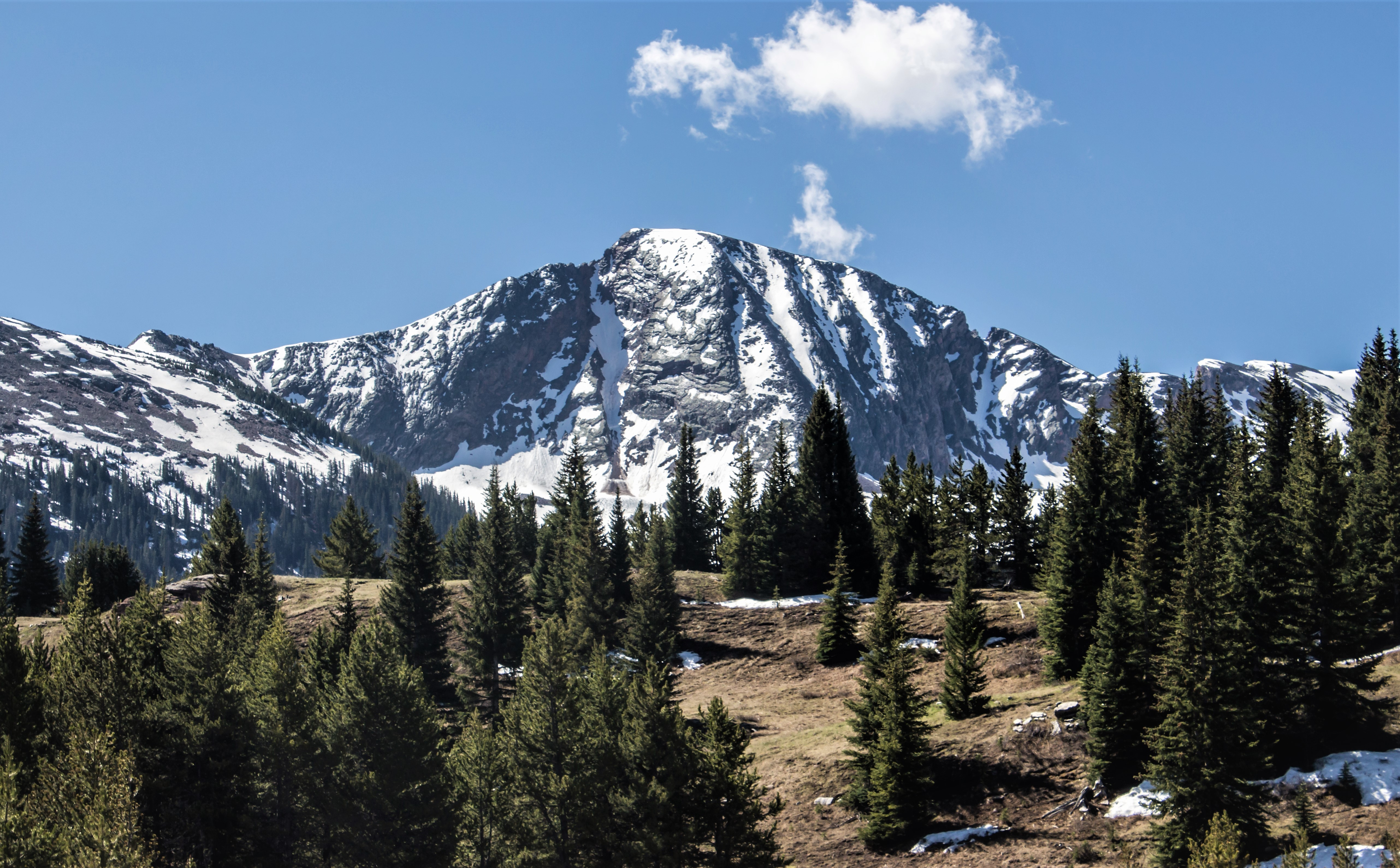
- Northwest aspect

Highest point
- Elevation: 13,077 ft (3,986 m)
- Prominence: 1,317 ft (401 m)
- Parent peak: Twilight Peak (13,163 ft)
- Isolation: 3.75 mi (6.04 km)
- Coordinates: 37°42′28″N 107°41′20″W

Naming
- Etymology: Snowdon

Geography
- Location within Colorado Location within the United States
- Location: San Juan County, Colorado, US
- Parent range: Rocky Mountains; San Juan Mountains; Needle Mountains
- Topo map: USGS Snowdon Peak

Geology
- Rock age: Statherian
- Rock type: Quartzite

Climbing
- Easiest route: class 2+ scramble NE ridge

Snowdon Peak is a 13,077-foot-elevation (3,986-meter) mountain summit located in San Juan County, Colorado, United States. It is situated seven miles south of the community of Silverton, in the Weminuche Wilderness, on land managed by San Juan National Forest. It is part of the San Juan Mountains range which is a subset of the Rocky Mountains of North America, and is set nine miles west of the Continental Divide. Topographic relief is significant as the east aspect rises 4,300 feet (1,300 meters) above the Animas River in approximately 1.5 mile. Neighbors include Mount Garfield three miles to the east-southeast, and Twilight Peak, which is the nearest higher peak, 3.7 miles to the south-southwest. This mountain can be seen from U.S. Route 550. The mountain is named after Snowdon, the highest mountain in Wales.

== Climate ==
According to the Köppen climate classification system, Snowdon Peak is located in an alpine subarctic climate zone with long, cold, snowy winters, and cool to warm summers. Due to its altitude, it receives precipitation all year, as snow in winter, and as thunderstorms in summer, with a dry period in late spring. Precipitation runoff from the mountain drains into tributaries of the Animas River.

== Geology ==
Snowdon Peak is part of the Uncompahgre Formation, which is a sequence of quartzite and black phyllite some 8,200 feet (2,500 meters) in thickness. The formation dates to the Statherian period and is interpreted as metamorphosed marine and fluvial sandstone, mudstone, and shale. The formation overlies plutons with an age of 1,707 million years.

== Gallery ==
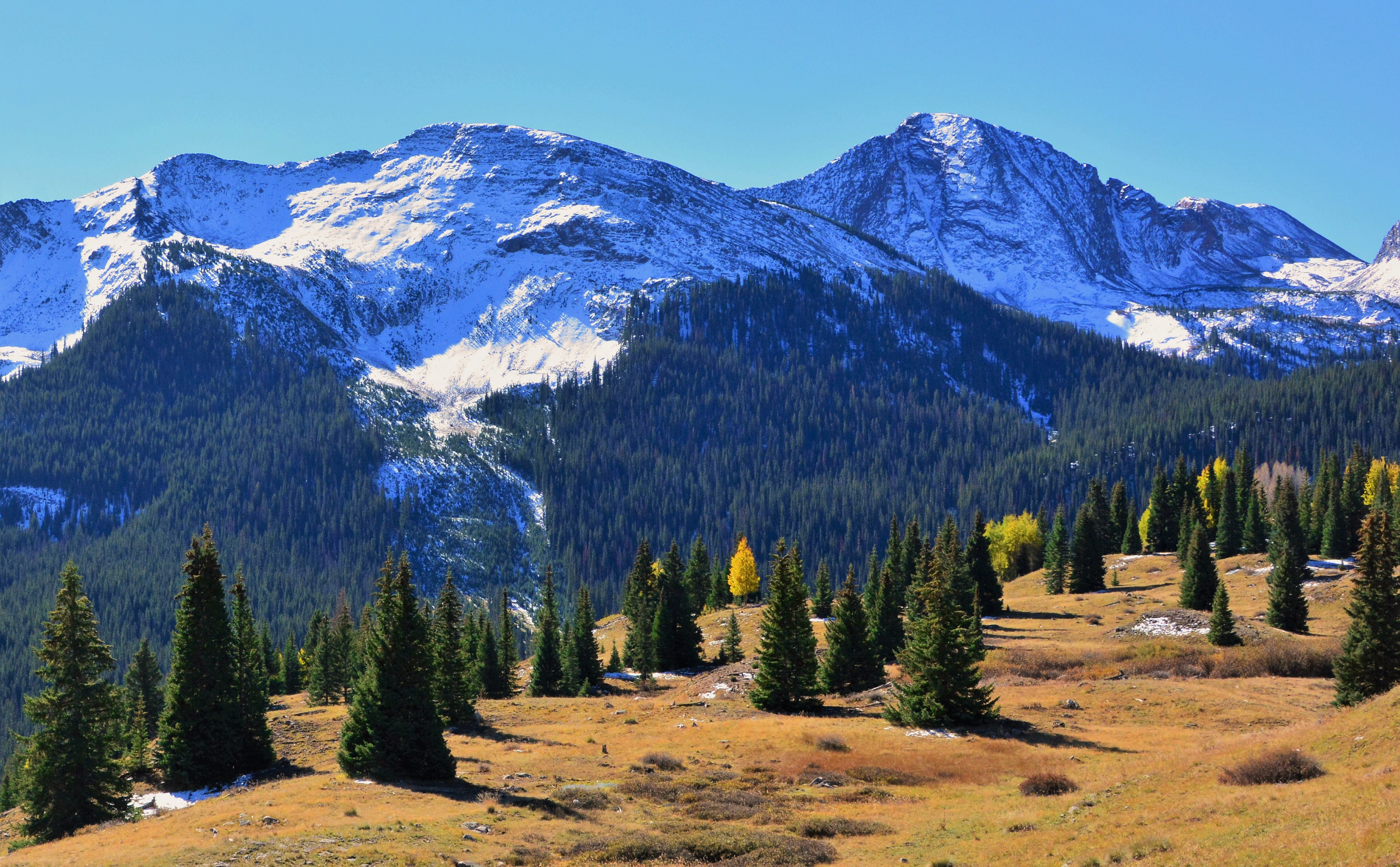
12,628' (left) and Snowdon Peak (right)

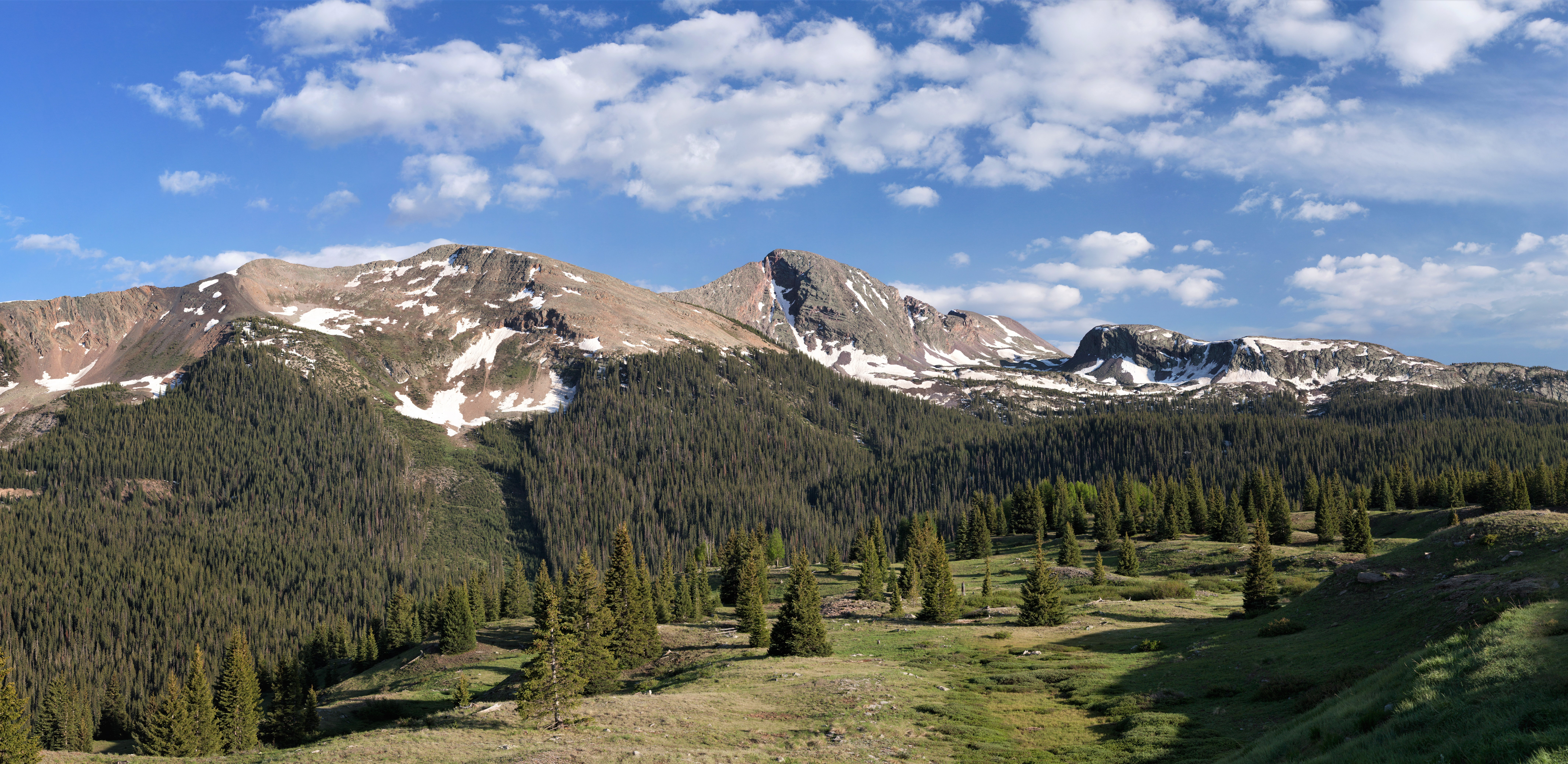
Snowdon Peak from US Route 550

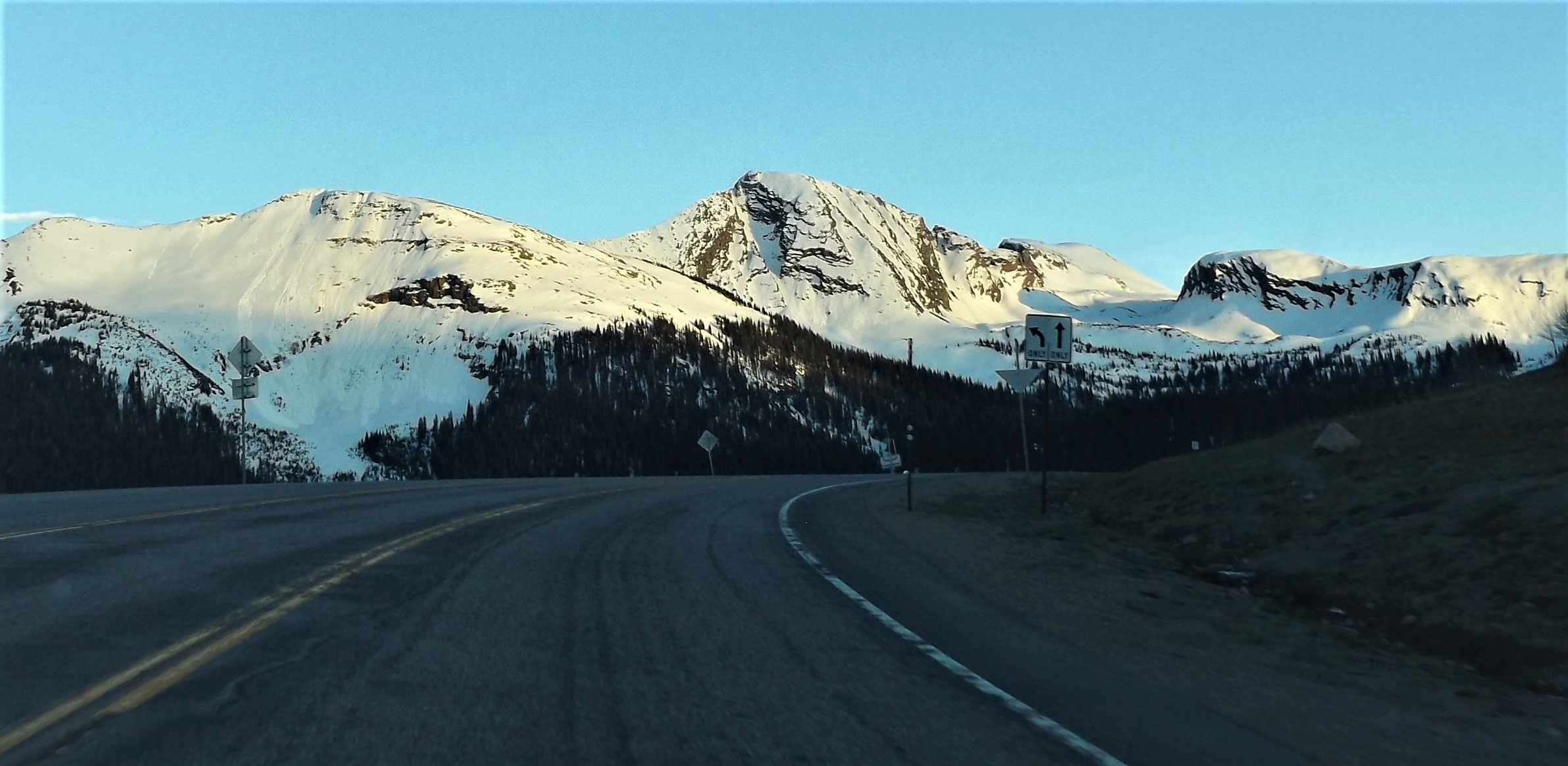
Snowdon Peak from Highway 550

Snowdon Peak from Molas Pass

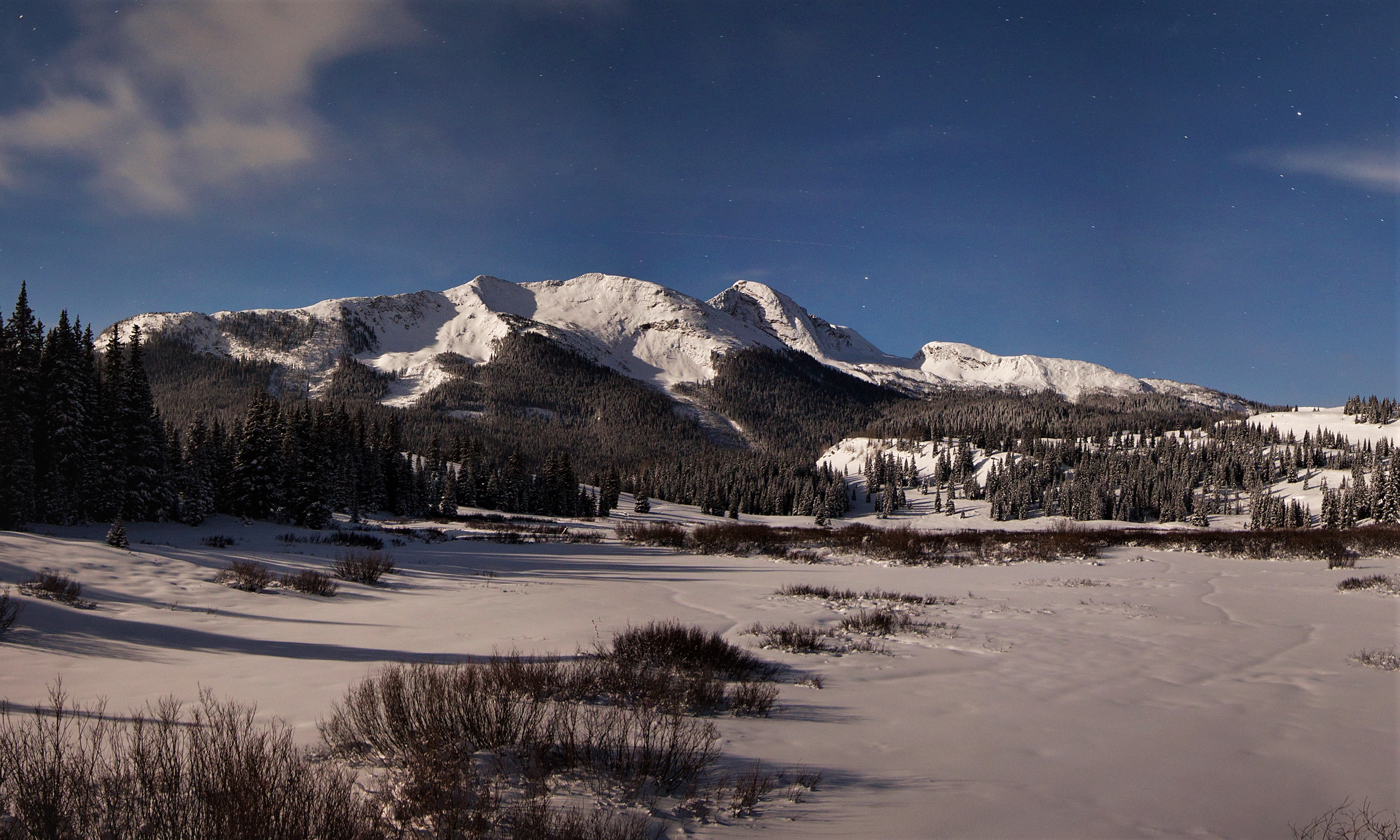
Snowdon Peak illuminated by moonlight

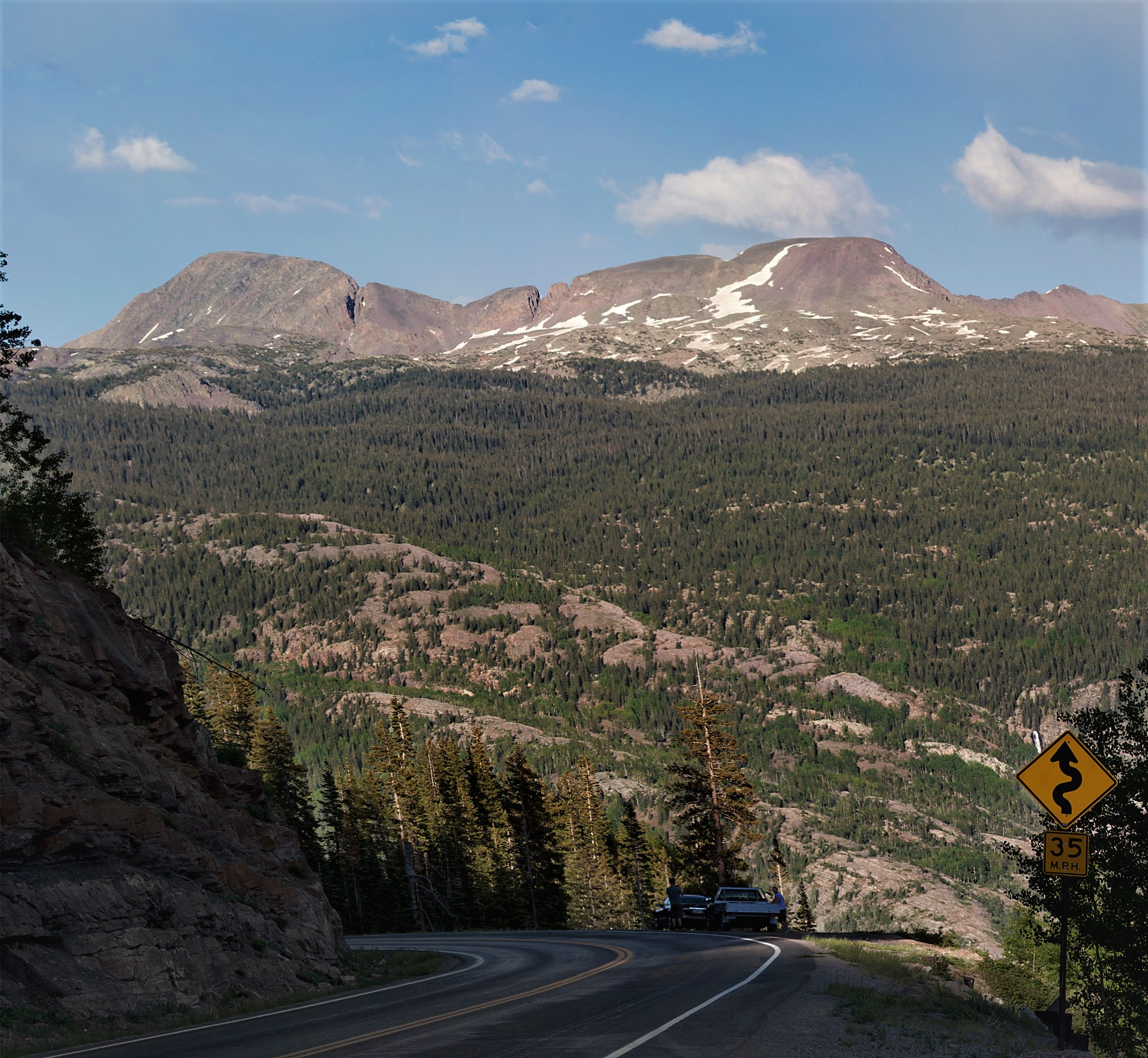
Snowden Peak to left. West aspect, from near Coal Bank Pass

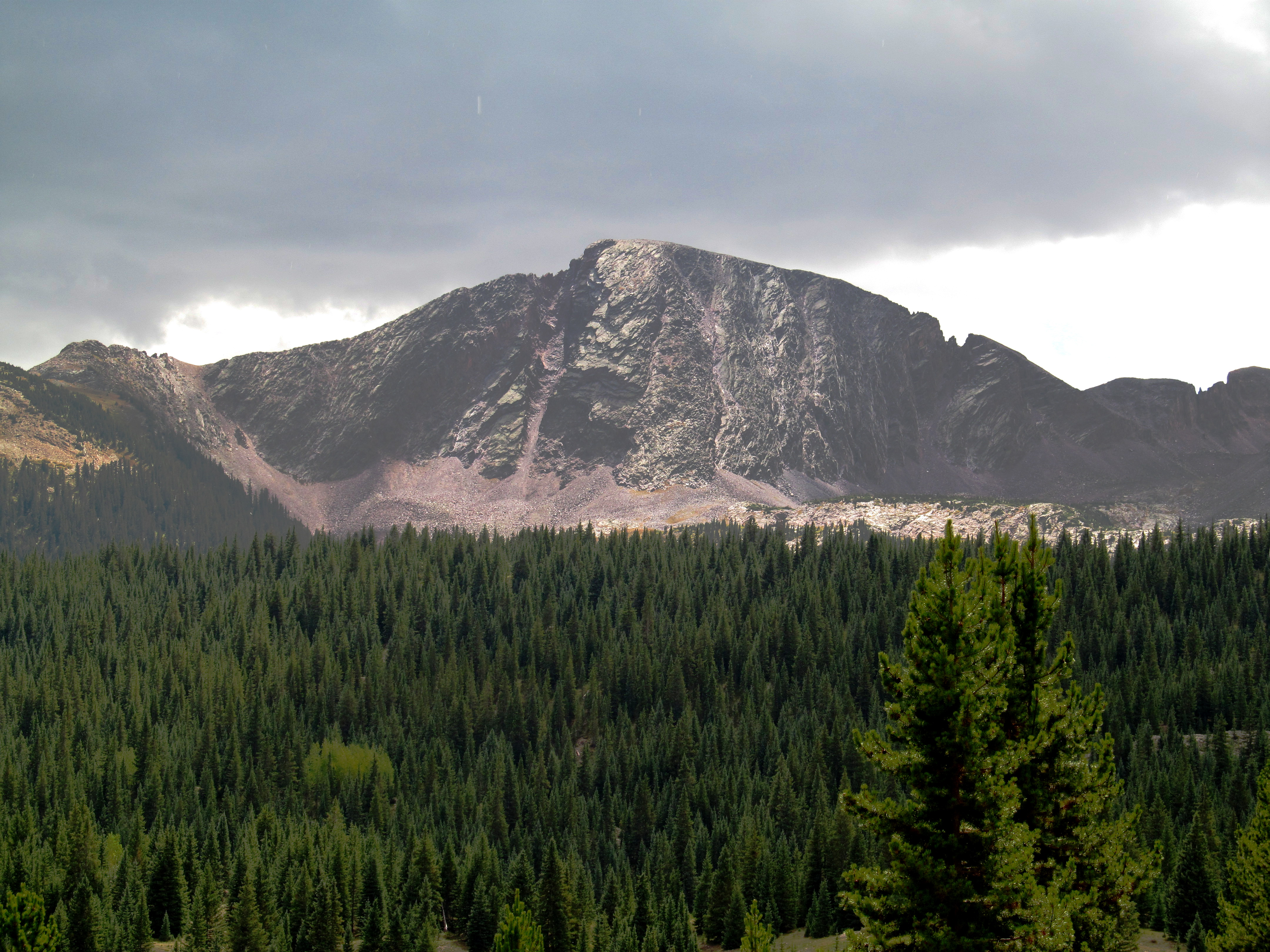

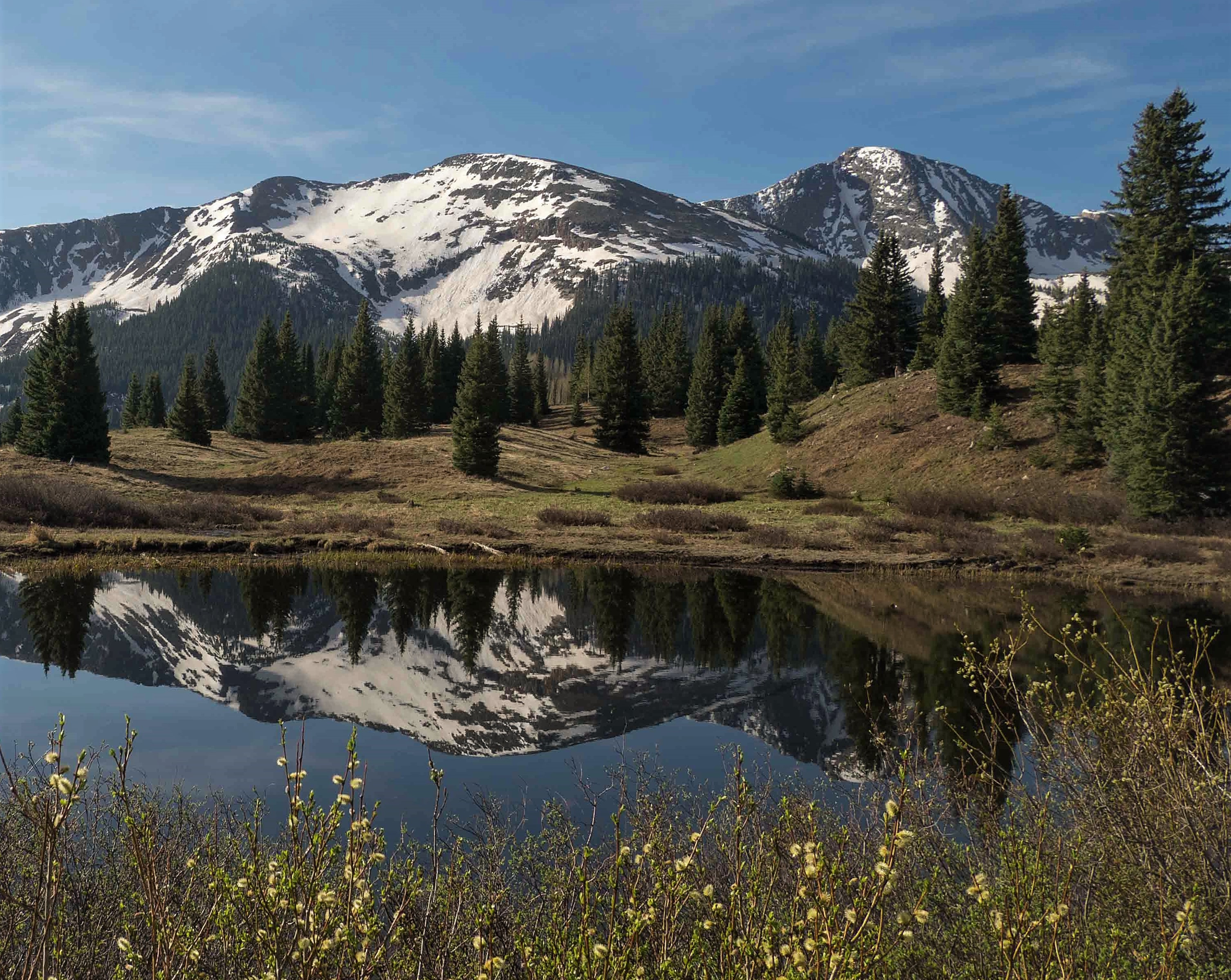
Snowdon Peak to the right

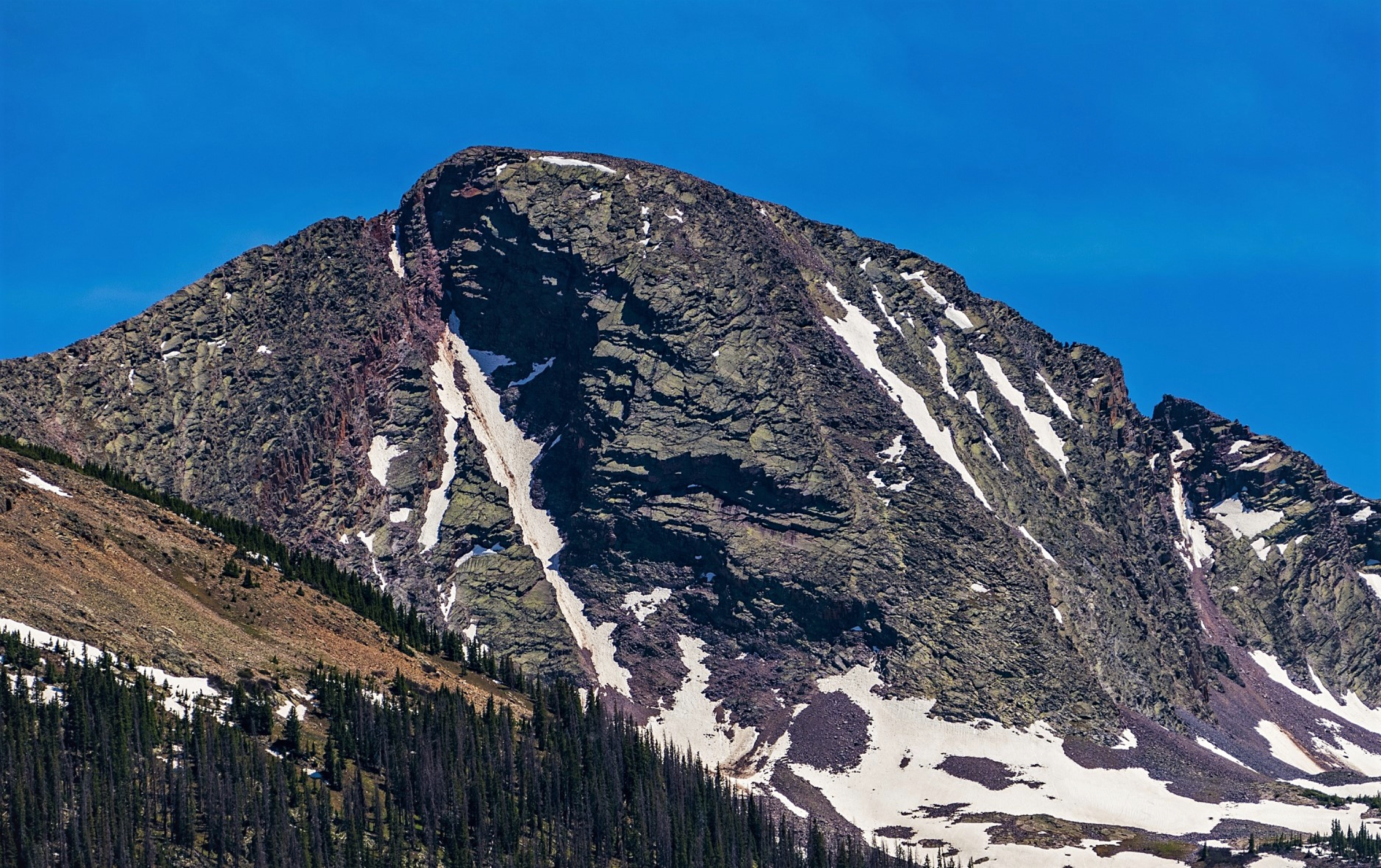

== See also ==
- Mountains of San Juan County, Colorado
