= Irving Formation =

Geologic formation in Colorado, US

- Stratigraphic range: Statherian
- Type: Formation
- Underlies: Vallecito Conglomerate
- Overlies: Twilight Gneiss
- Thickness: Over 10,000 feet (3,000 m)

Lithology
- Primary: Metavolcanic rock
- Other: Metasedimentary rock

Location
- Coordinates: 37.595°N 107.509°W
- Region: San Juan Mountains, Colorado
- Country: United States

Type section
- Named for: Irving Peak
- Named by: Ernest Howe
- Year defined: 1904
- Irving Formation (the United States) Irving Formation (Colorado)

The Irving Formation is a Precambrian geologic formation found in the San Juan Mountains of southwest Colorado, US. It is thought to be Statherian in age (1800 to 1790 million years old.)

== Description ==
The formation consists of a variety of lithologies (rock varieties) including amphibolite, various schists and gneisses of intermediate to felsic composition, quartzite, metasiltstone, and banded iron formation. A bed of conglomerate is found near the base of the formation in some locations. The beds show indications of mild retrograde metamorphism and dip steeply to the north. It was intruded by the Twilight Gneiss between 1780 and 1770 million years ago (Mya). The complex is older than the Vallecito Conglomerate.

The formation underlies Irving Peak in the San Juan Mountains of Colorado and is exposed across the western and northern Needle Mountains. It is at least a few thousand meters (several thousand feet) thick.

The unit is interpreted as a portion of an island arc accreted to the southern margin of Laurentia as part of the Yavapai Province between 1.8 and 1.755 Gya. Metasedimentary rocks of the formation are interpreted as turbidites derived from the island arc.

== Economic resources ==
The formation was surveyed in 1969 for iron ore. Magnetite-rich beds were found in a few locations but were not judged economical to exploit.

== History of investigation ==
The unit was first named as the Irving Greenstone by Ernest Howe in 1904. The definition was expanded by Fred Barker in 1969, who also renamed the formation as the Irving Formation.
