= Mount Garfield (San Juan County, Colorado) =

Mountain in Colorado, United States

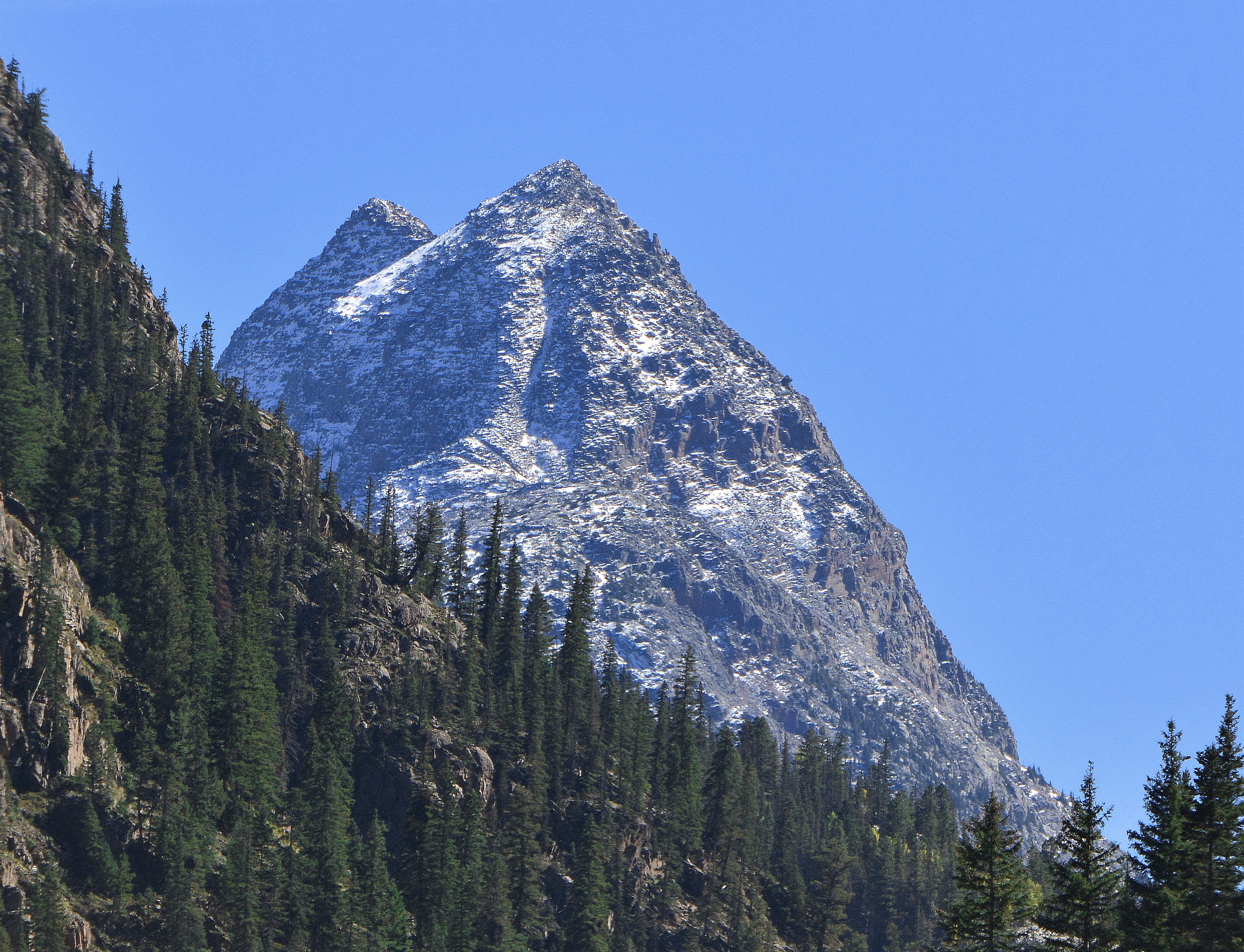
- North aspect

Highest point
- Elevation: 13,074 ft (3,985 m)
- Prominence: 354 ft (108 m)
- Parent peak: Graystone Peak (13,489 ft)
- Isolation: 0.99 mi (1.59 km)
- Coordinates: 37°41′41″N 107°38′10″W

Geography
- Location within Colorado Location within the United States
- Location: San Juan County, Colorado, US
- Parent range: Rocky Mountains; San Juan Mountains; Needle Mountains
- Topo map: USGS Snowdon Peak

Geology
- Rock age: Statherian
- Mountain type: Glacial horn
- Rock type: Quartzite

Climbing
- Easiest route: class 3 scramble SE ridge

Mount Garfield is a 13,074-foot-elevation (3,985-meter) mountain summit located in San Juan County, Colorado, United States. It is situated eight miles south of the community of Silverton, in the Weminuche Wilderness, on land managed by San Juan National Forest. It is part of the San Juan Mountains range which is a subset of the Rocky Mountains of North America. Precipitation runoff from the mountain drains into tributaries of the Animas River. The peak can be seen from U.S. Route 550 and the Durango and Silverton Narrow Gauge Railroad. Topographic relief is significant as the west aspect rises over 4,300 feet (1,300 meters) above the river and railway in approximately one mile. It is set six miles west of the Continental Divide, one mile west of Electric Peak, and three miles east-southeast of Snowdon Peak.

== Climate ==
According to the Köppen climate classification system, Mt. Garfield is located in an alpine subarctic climate zone with very long, cold, snowy winters, and cool to warm summers. Due to its altitude, it receives precipitation all year, as snow in winter, and as thunderstorms in summer, with a dry period in late spring.

== Geology ==
Mt. Garfield is a glacial horn of the Uncompahgre Formation, which is a sequence of quartzite and black phyllite some 8,200 feet (2,500 meters) in thickness. The formation dates to the Statherian period and is interpreted as metamorphosed marine and fluvial sandstone, mudstone, and shale. The formation overlies plutons with an age of 1,707 million years.

== Gallery ==
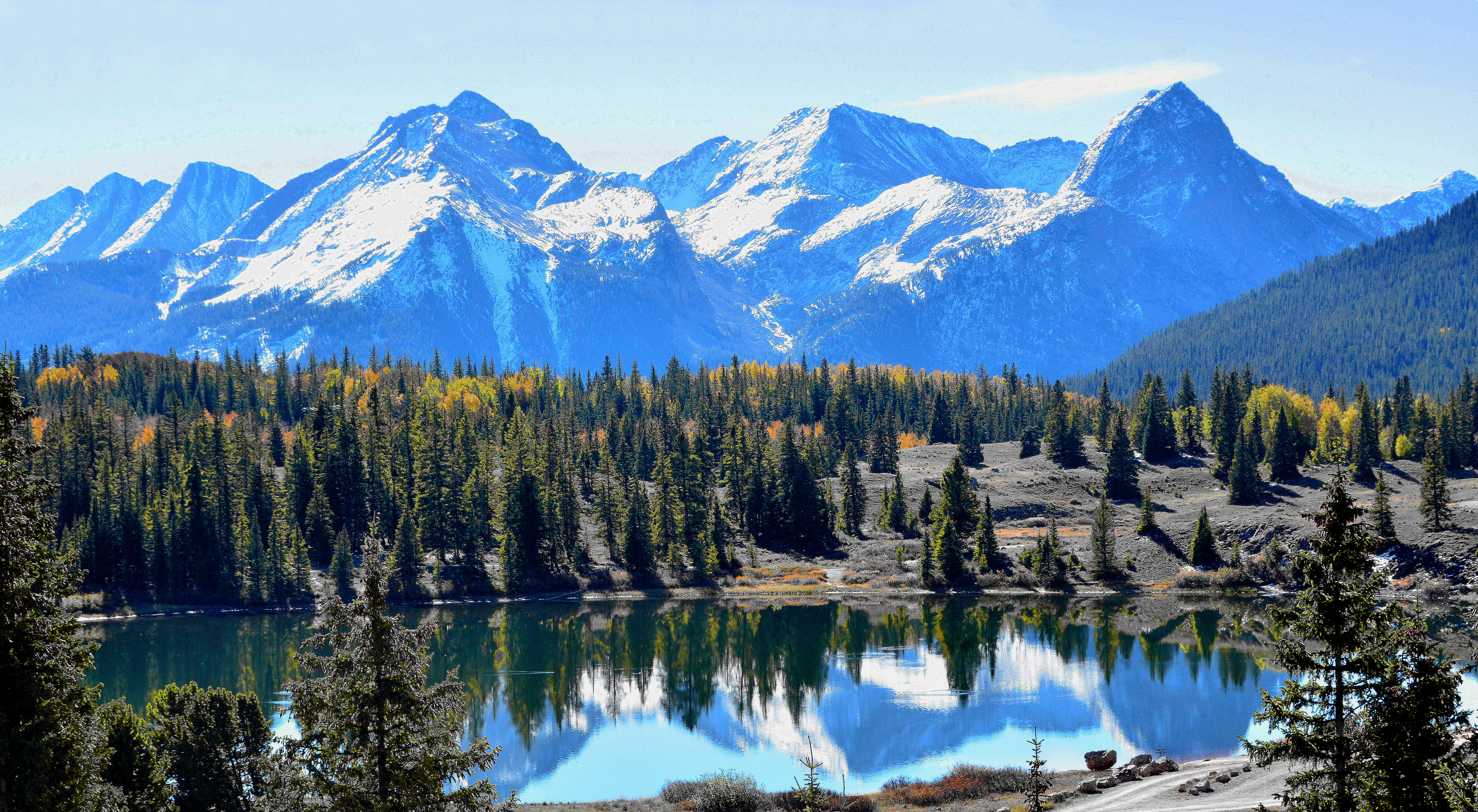
Electric Peak, Graystone Peak (center), Mt. Garfield (right) viewed from Molas Lake

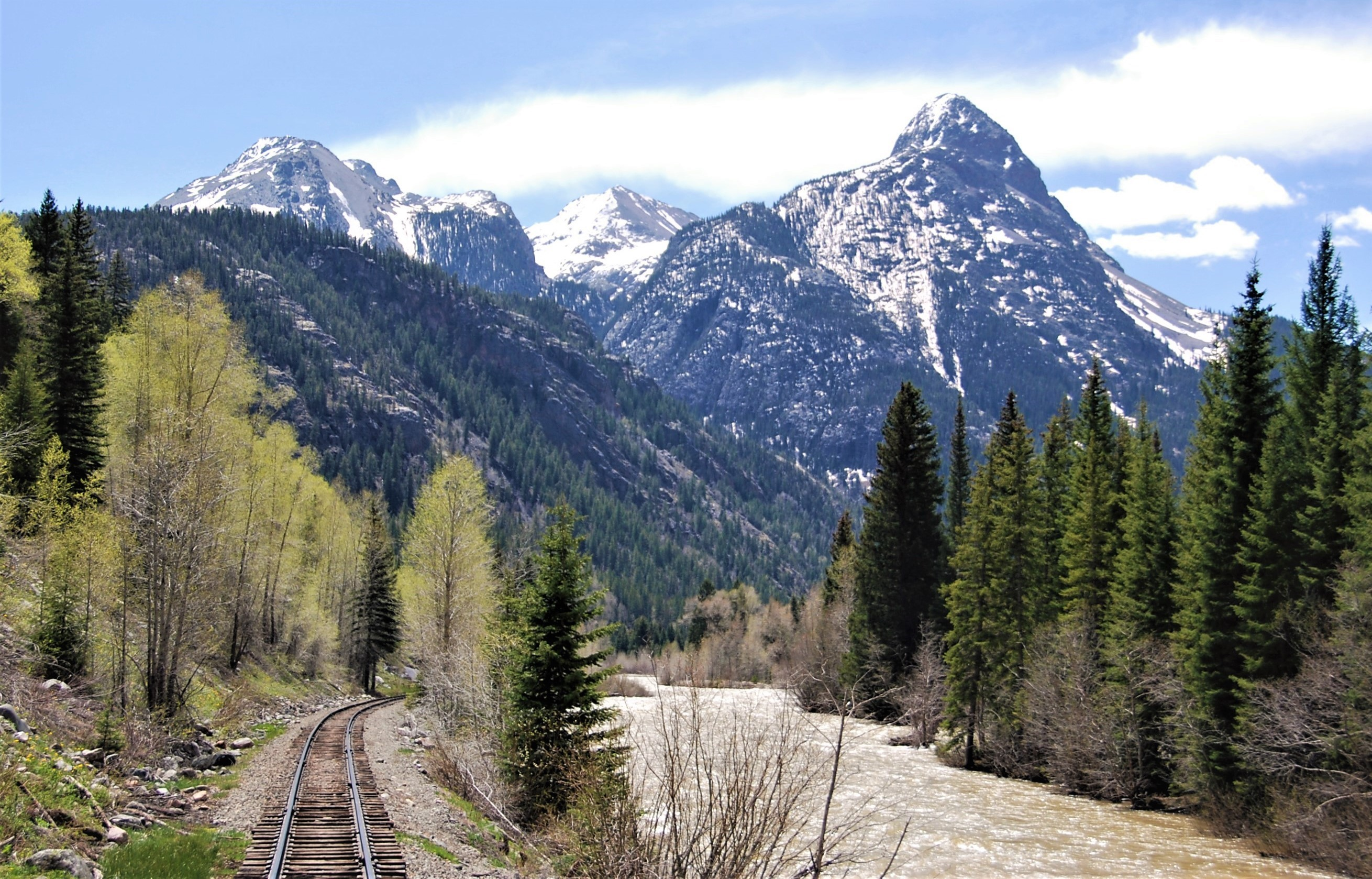
Garfield (right) seen with Animas River from Durango and Silverton train

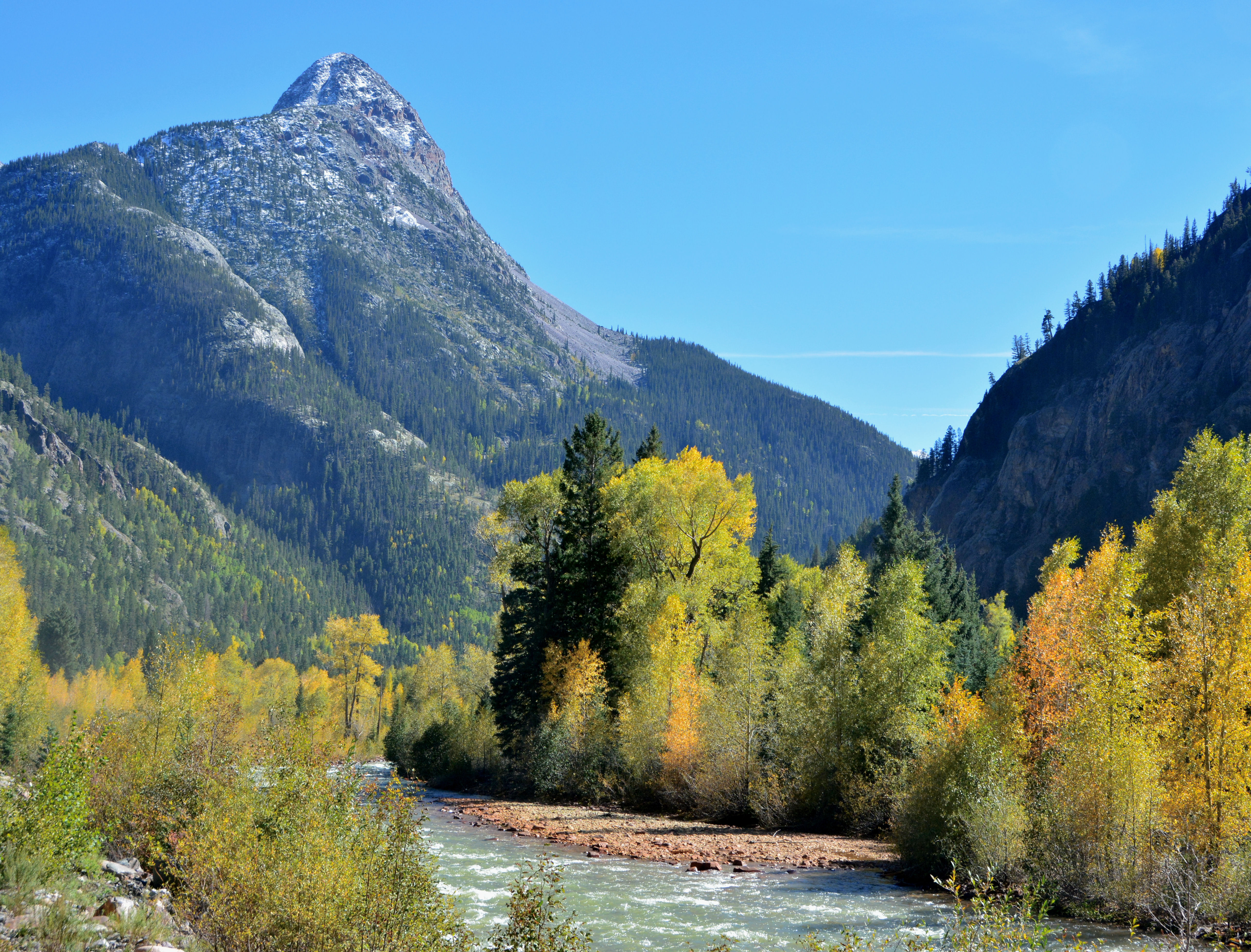
Garfield seen with Animas River from train

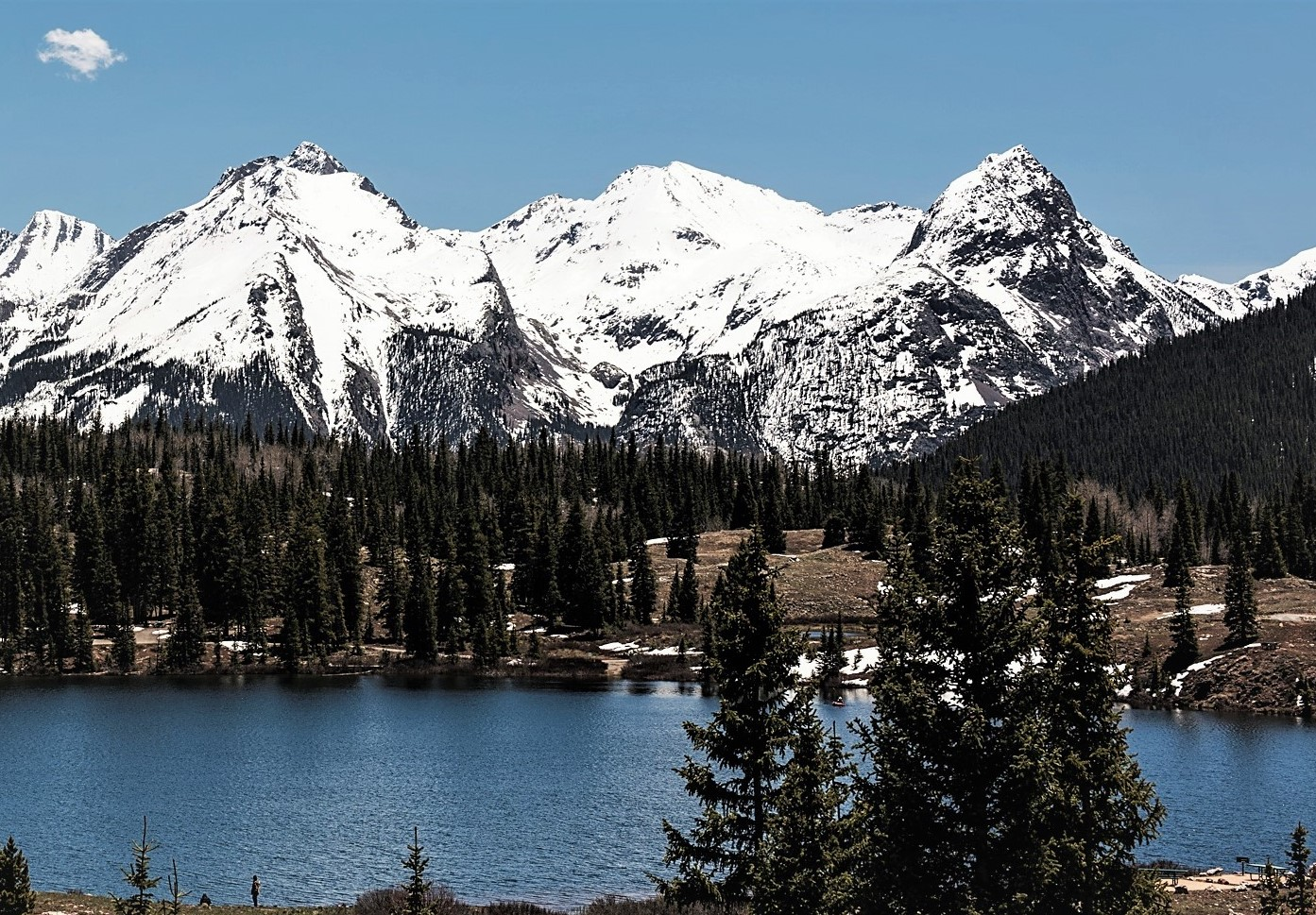
Electric Peak, Graystone Peak (center), Mt. Garfield (right) from Molas Lake

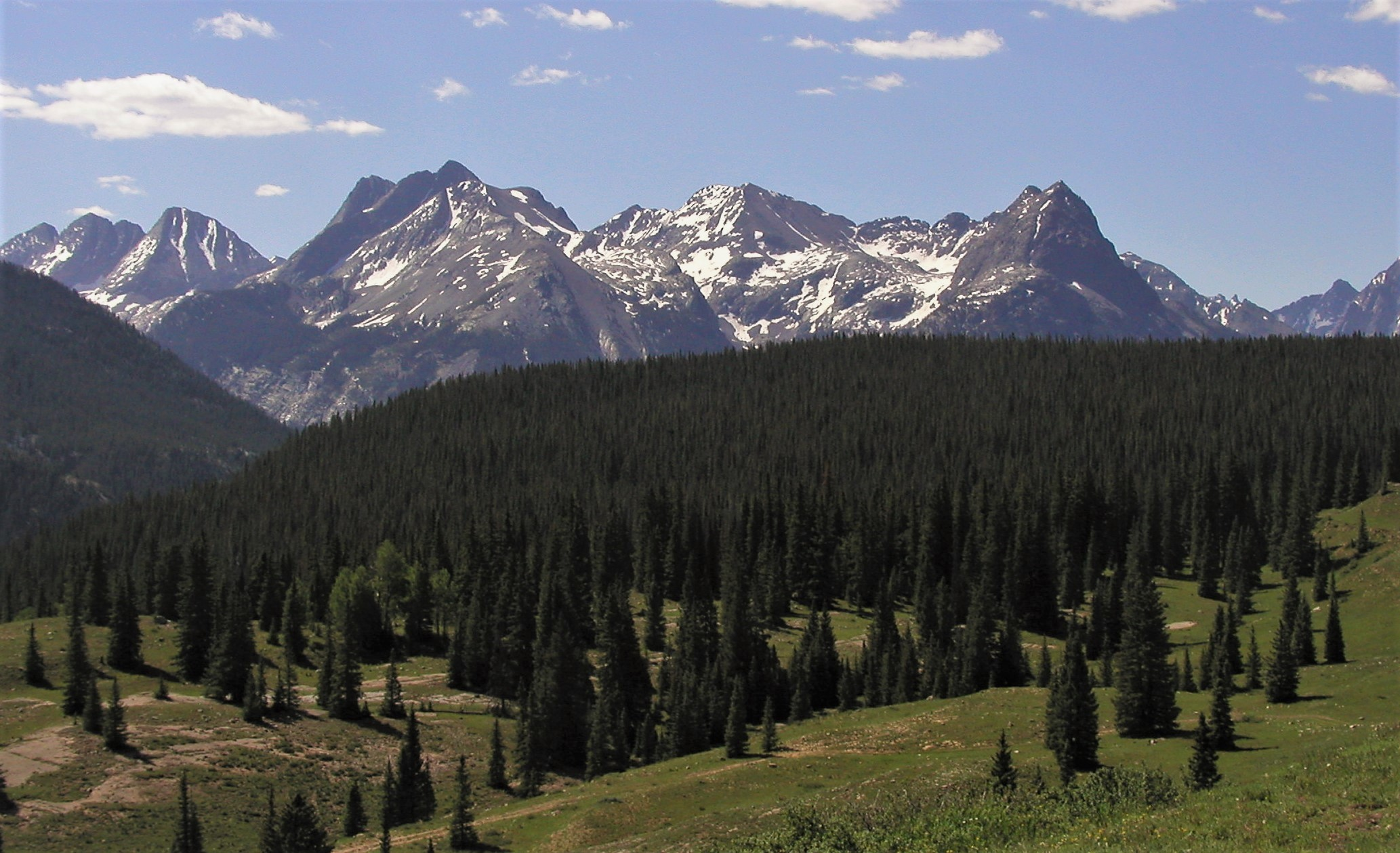
Electric Peak, Graystone Peak (center), Mt. Garfield (right)

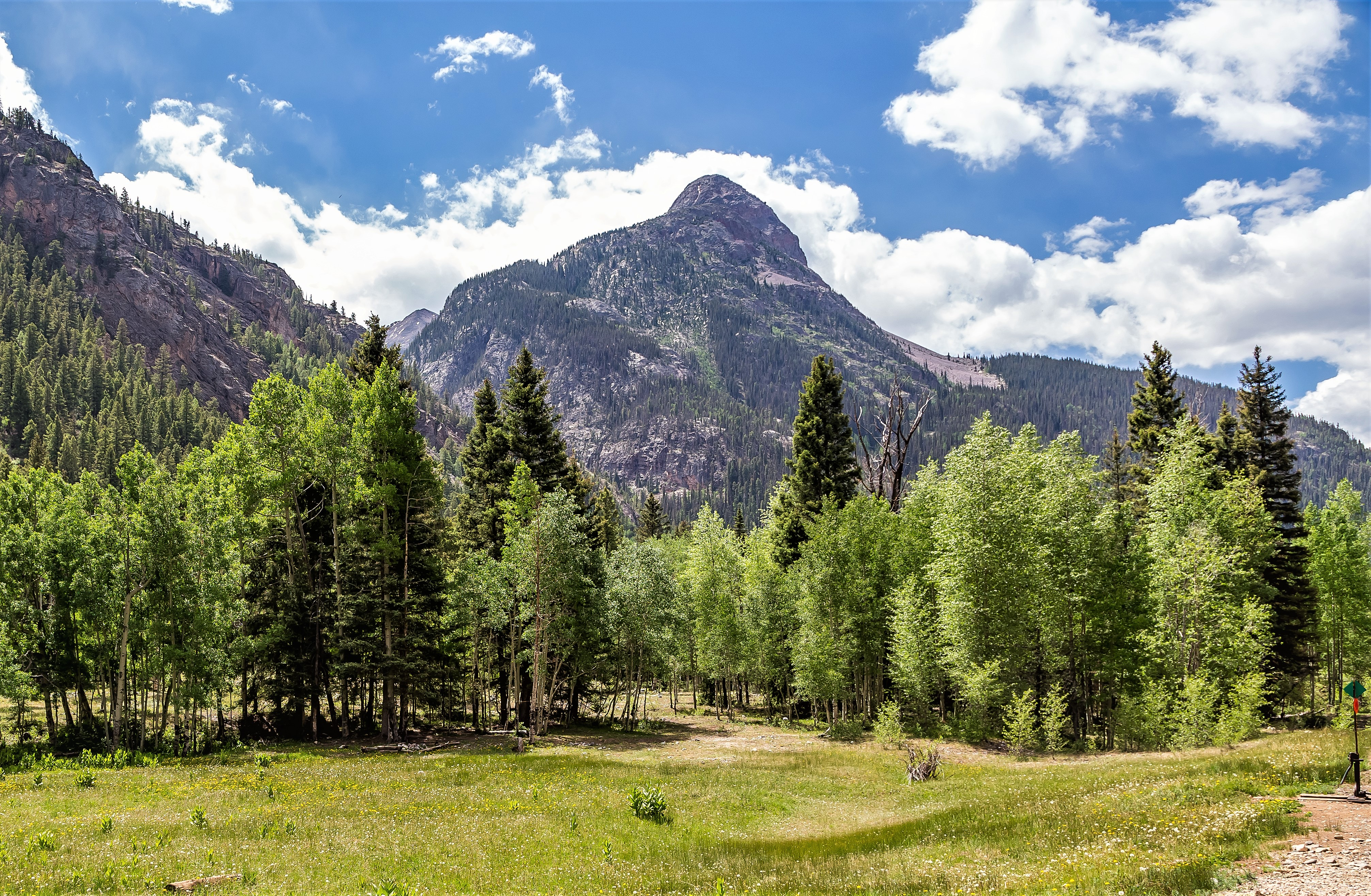
