= Vestal Peak =

Mountain in the state of Colorado

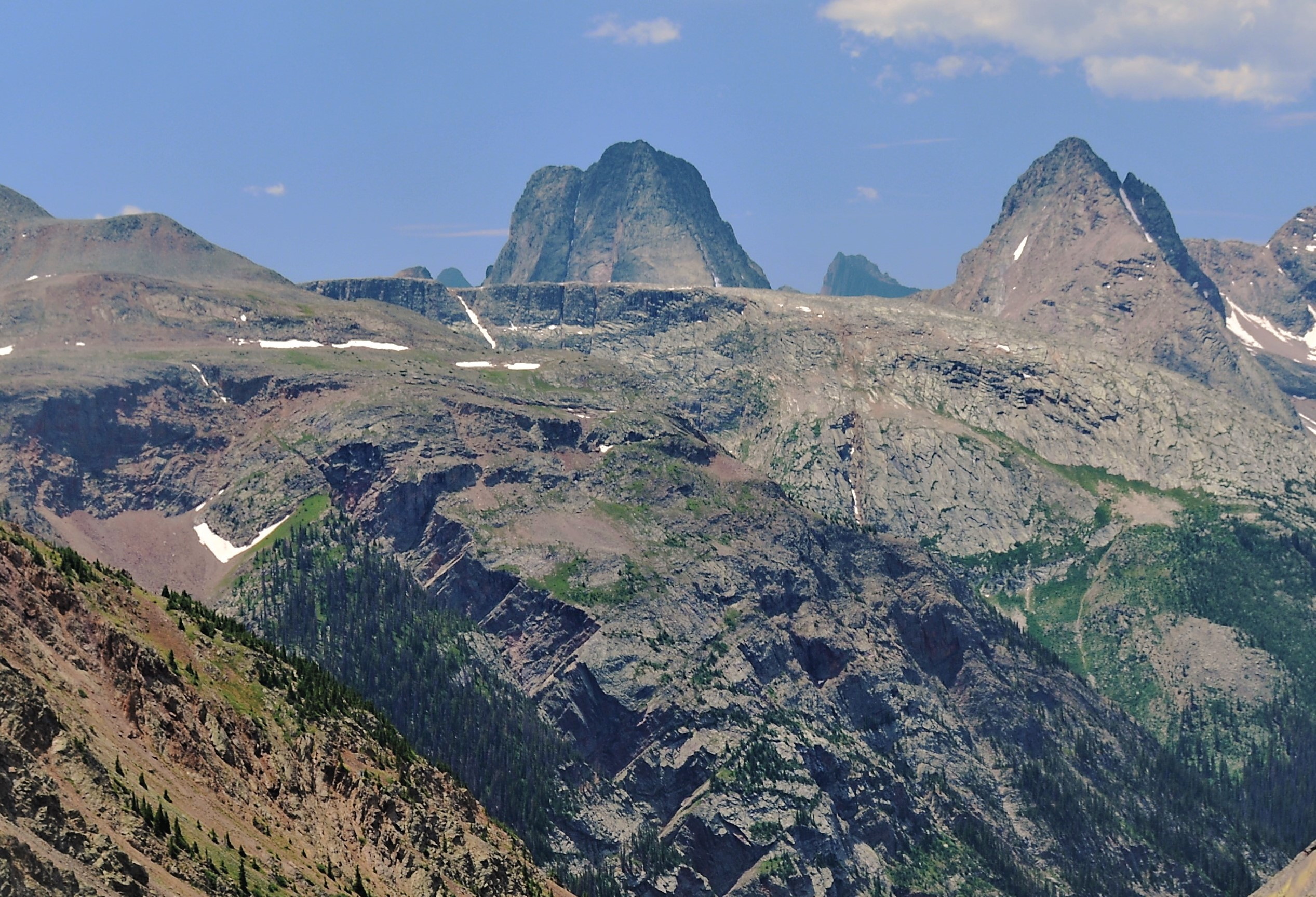
- Vestal Peak centered in the distance (Arrow Peak to the right)

Highest point
- Elevation: 13,870 ft (4,228 m)
- Prominence: 1,124 ft (343 m)
- Isolation: 4.29 mi (6.90 km)
- Listing: Colorado range high points
- Coordinates: 37°41′22″N 107°36′09″W

Geography
- Location within Colorado
- Location: San Juan County, Colorado, U.S.
- Parent range: San Juan Mountains, Needle Mountains, Highest summit of the Grenadier Range
- Topo map(s): USGS 7.5' topographic map Storm King Peak, Colorado

Climbing
- Easiest route: hike, exposed scramble

Vestal Peak, elevation 13,870 ft (4,230 m), is a summit in the Needle Mountains of southwest Colorado. The peak is southeast of Silverton in the Weminuche Wilderness.

== See also ==
- List of Colorado mountain ranges
- List of Colorado mountain summits
  - List of Colorado fourteeners
  - List of Colorado 4000 meter prominent summits
  - List of the most prominent summits of Colorado
- List of Colorado county high points
