= Uncompahgre Formation =

Geological formation in Colarado, United States

- Stratigraphic range: Statherian
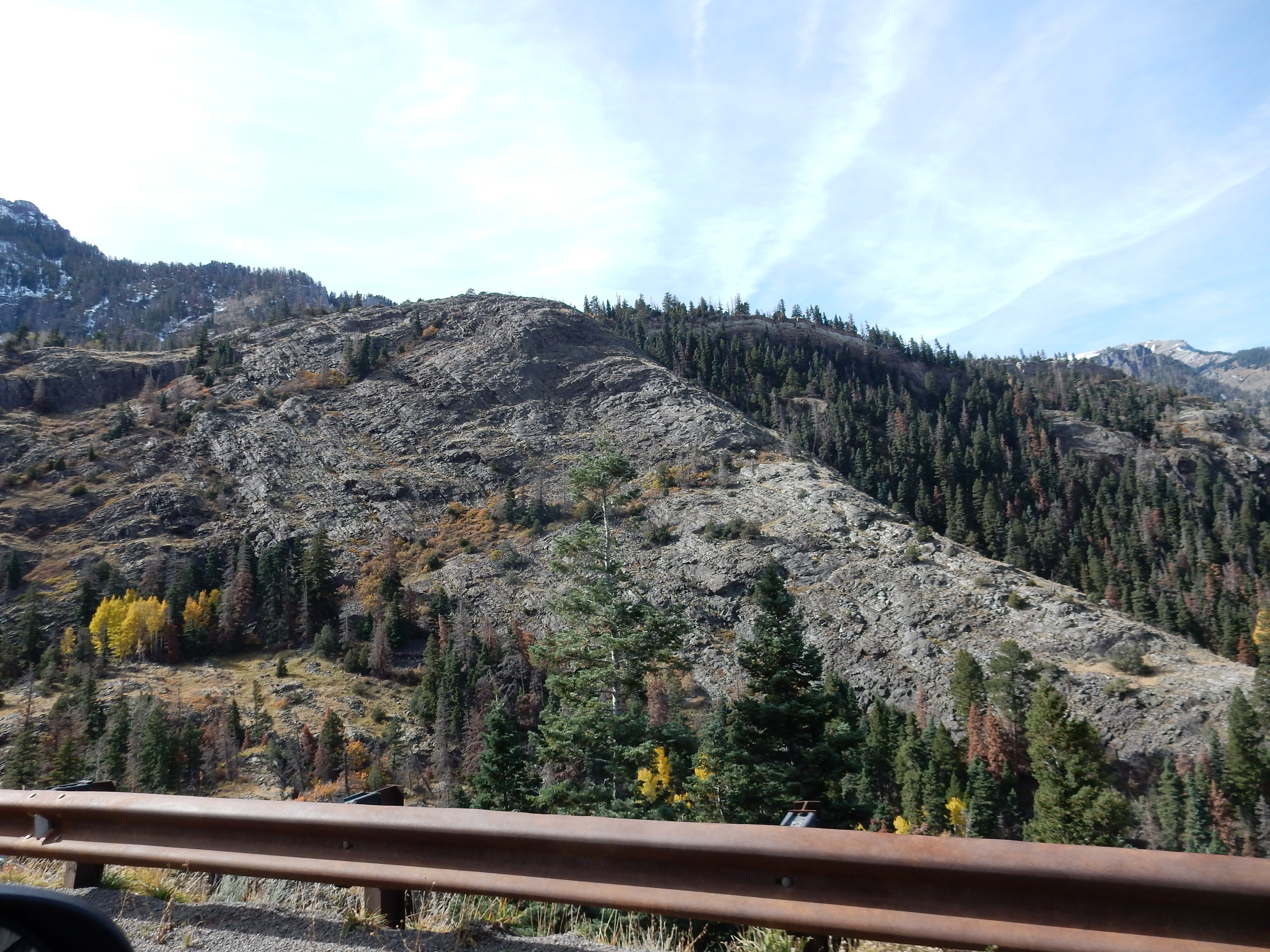
- Uncompahgre Formation slate beds at Molas Pass, Colorado, US
- Type: Formation
- Underlies: Ignacio Formation
- Overlies: Irving Formation, Twilight Formation
- Thickness: 2,500 m (8,200 ft)

Lithology
- Primary: Quartzite
- Other: Phyllite

Location
- Region: Colorado
- Country: United States

Type section
- Named for: Uncompahgre Gorge
- Named by: Cross and Howe
- Year defined: 1905

The Uncompahgre Formation is a geologic formation in Colorado. Its radiometric age is between 1707 and 1704 Ma, corresponding to the Statherian period.

== History ==
The formation was first named by Charles Whitman Cross and Ernest Howe in 1905 for exposures around Uncompahgre Gorge near Ouray, Colorado. They grouped it with the Vallecito Conglomerate into the Needle Mountains Group, but this was abandoned by Tweto in 1977. Karl Karlstrom and coinvestigators informally raised the Uncompahgre Formation to group rank in 2017, assigning the Vallecito Conglomerate as a member.

== Geology ==
The Uncompahgre Formation is a sequence of quartzite and black phyllite some 2,500 meters (8,200 feet) in thickness. It is exposed in a curving belt from the northwestern to northeastern Needle Mountains with outliers near Ouray and Rico, Colorado. It is interpreted as metamorphosed marine and fluvial sandstone, mudstone, and shale.

The formation overlies plutons with an age of 1707 Ma and detrital zircon geochronology confirms a maximum age of 1709 Ma. Ar^{40}Ar/^{39}Ar dating of muscovite in an intruding dike gives a minimum age of 1704 Ma, allowing the age of the Uncompahgre Formation to be tightly constrained. Dating of contact metamorphism aureoles show the formation was deformed by metamorphosis at around 1460 to 1400 Ma, concurrent with the Picuris orogeny. The formation is thought to be correlative with the Ortega Formation in northern New Mexico and the Mazatzal Group in Arizona.

== Footnotes ==
=== References ===
- Cross, Whitman; Howe, Ernest (1905a). "Description of the Silverton quadrangle [Colorado]". U.S. Geological Survey Geologic Atlas of the United States Folio. Vol. Silverton folio, no. 120.
- Cross, Whitman; Howe, Ernest (1905b). "Description of Needle Mountain quadrangle [Colorado]". U.S. Geological Survey Geologic Atlas of the United States Folio. Vol. Needle Mountains folio, no. 131.
- Davis, Peter; Williams, Mike; Karlstrom, Karl (2011). "Structural evolution and timing of deformation along the Proterozoic Spring Creek shear zone of the northern Tusas Mountains, New Mexico" (PDF). New Mexico Geological Society Field Conference Series. 62: 177–190.
- Karlstrom, K.E.; Gonzales, D.A.; Heizler, M.; Zinnser, A. (2017). "^{40}Ar/^{39}Ar age constraints on the deposition and metamorphism of the Uncompahgre Group, southwestern Colorado" (PDF). New Mexico Geological Society Field Conference Series. 68: 83–90.
- Tweto, Ogden (1977). "Nomenclature of Precambrian rocks in Colorado". Contributions to Stratigraphy: U.S. Geological Survey Bulletin, 1422-D: D1 – D22.
