= Needle Mountains =

Mountain range in Colorado, United States

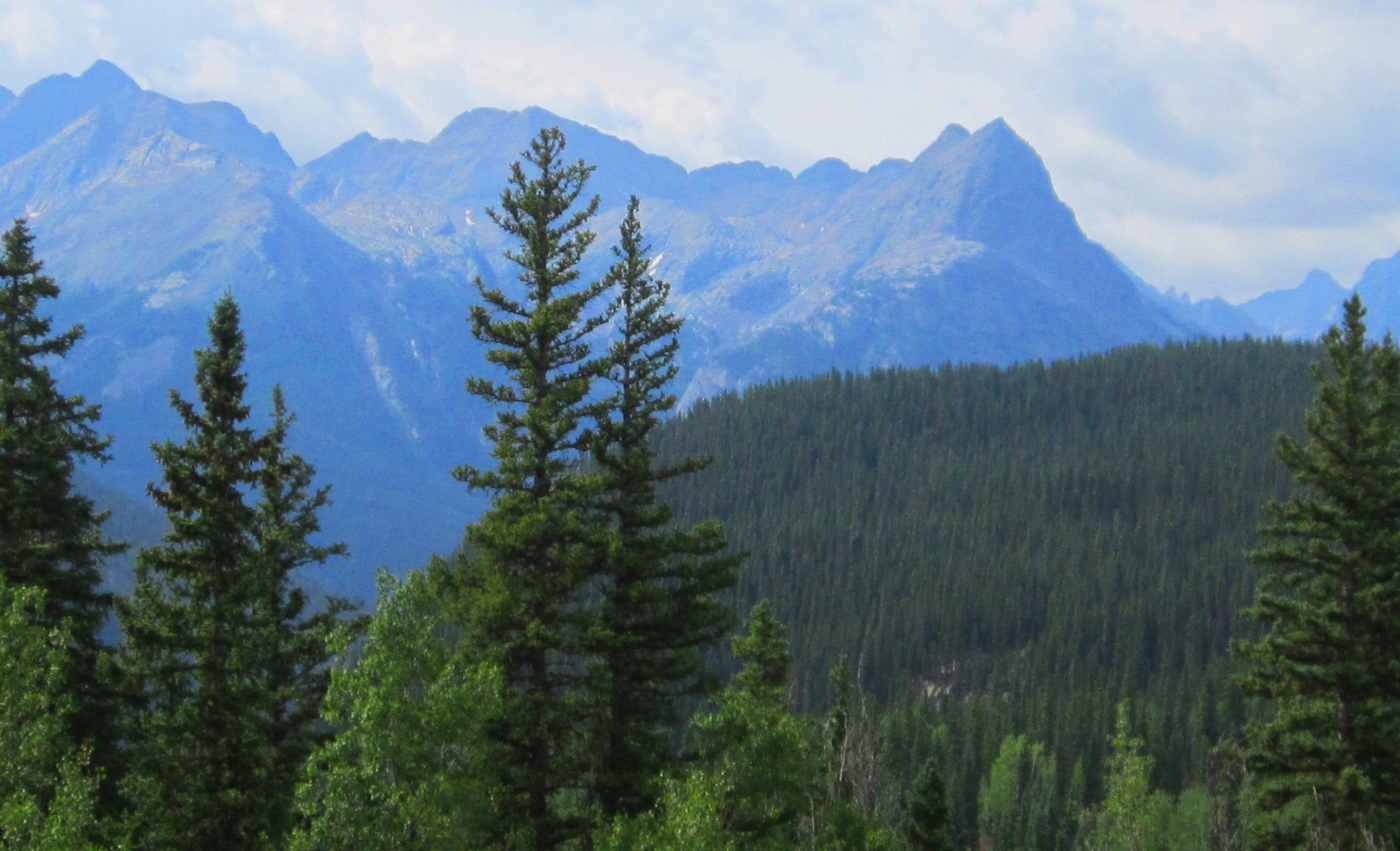
- Needle Mountains seen from the San Juan Skyway.

Highest point
- Peak: Windom Peak
- Elevation: 14,093 ft (4,296 m)
- Listing: Mountain ranges of Colorado
- Coordinates: 37°37′19″N 107°37′22″W

Geography
- Location within Colorado
- Country: United States
- State: Colorado
- Parent range: San Juan Mountains; Rocky Mountains

The Needle Mountains are a subrange of the San Juan Mountains of the Rocky Mountains located in the southwestern part of the U.S. State of Colorado. Much of the range is protected in the Weminuche Wilderness of the San Juan National Forest. The range is notable for having some of the most rugged mountains in the state, and includes many technical climbs and scrambles. A small but dramatic east–west subrange in the northern section is known as the Grenadier Range.

== Geology ==
Unlike the rest of the San Juan Mountains, which are volcanic in origin, the Needle Mountains (along with the Grenadier Range) are a mass of uplifted Precambrian rocks. They consist chiefly of quartzite, granite, and amphibolite. The mountains are referred to as the Needle Mountains Uplift.

== Notable peaks ==
- Windom Peak, 14,093 ft
- Mount Eolus, 14,090 ft
- Sunlight Peak, 14,065 ft
- Pigeon Peak, 13,978 ft
- Vestal Peak, 13,870 ft (Grenadier Range)
- Turret Peak, 13,841 ft
- Jagged Mountain, 13,830 ft
- Arrow Peak, 13,809 ft (Grenadier Range)
- Animas Mountain, 13,786 ft
- Storm King Peak, 13,752 ft (Grenadier Range)
- Mount Silex, 13,628 ft
- The Guardian (Colorado), 13,617 ft
- Leviathan Peak, 13,528 ft
- Graystone Peak 13,489 ft
- Vallecito Mountain, 13,428 ft
- Snowdon Peak, 13,077 ft
- Mount Garfield, 13,074 ft
