= Statherian =

Fourth and last period of the Paleoproterozoic Era

- 1800 – 1600 Ma
- Map of Earth during the Statherian, c. 1700 Ma

Chronology
← / Rafatazmia evolves, Chuanlinggou Formation preserves oldest macroscopic eukaryotes; ← / Natural nuclear fission reactors form in Oklo, Gabon; ← / Beginning of the Boring Billion
Events of the Statherian Period; Vertical axis scale: Millions of years ago

Etymology
- Name formality: Formal

Usage information
- Celestial body: Earth
- Regional usage: Global (ICS)
- Time scale(s) used: ICS Time Scale

Definition
- Chronological unit: Period
- Stratigraphic unit: System
- Time span formality: Formal
- Lower boundary definition: Defined chronometrically
- Lower GSSA ratified: 1990
- Upper boundary definition: Defined chronometrically
- Upper GSSA ratified: 1990

The Statherian ( /stəˈθɪəriən/; Ancient Greek: σταθερός, romanized: statherós, meaning "stable, firm") is the fourth and final geologic period in the Paleoproterozoic Era, lasting from 1800 to 1600 million years ago (Ma) and spanning 200 million years. It follows the Orosirian Period and precedes the Calymmian Period, with the latter belonging to the Mesoproterozoic Era. Instead of being based on stratigraphy, these dates are defined chronometrically.

The period was characterized on most continents by either new platforms or final cratonization of fold belts. Oxygen levels were 10% to 20% of current values.

Rafatazmia, controversially claimed to be present in Statherian beds in India, may be the oldest known confirmably eukaryotic fossil organism.

By the beginning of the Statherian, the supercontinent Columbia had assembled.

Approximately 1.7 billion years ago, natural nuclear fission reactors were generating power in what is now Oklo, Gabon.

== See also ==
- Boring Billion – Earth history, 1.8 to 0.8 billion years ago
