= Azteca Theater =

Azteca Theater may refer to:

- Azteca Theater (Fresno, California), opened 1948, closed in the late 1980s, partially reopened in 1999 with an art gallery and events, listed on the National Register of Historic Places
- Azteca Theater (Houston, Texas), opened 1955 as Houston Theatre, renamed Azteca Theater in 1955, closed 1957
