= Azteca =

Azteca is the Spanish word for Aztec.

Azteca or Aztecas may refer to:

== Animals ==
- Azteca (ant), a genus of ants
- Azteca horse, a breed of horse

== Sport ==
- Aztecas, the teams of Universidad de las Américas Puebla, Mexico
- Adidas Azteca, the official match ball of 1986 FIFA World Cup in Mexico
- Estadio Azteca, a Mexican sports stadium officially known as Estadio Banorte
- Kid Azteca, ring name of Mexican boxer Luis Villanueva Páramo (1913–2002)

== Transport ==
- Líneas Aéreas Azteca, a Mexican airline
- Metro Ciudad Azteca, a Mexican train station
- Azteca, an automobile made by Fiberfab

== Media ==
- TV Azteca, a Mexican mass media company
  - Azteca América, Azteca's Spanish-language American broadcast network
- Azteca Productions, an American independent comic book publisher

== Music ==
- Azteca (band), an American Latin rock/jazz fusion group
  - Azteca (album), 1972 debut album of the band
- Azteca Records (California), a record label specializing in Mexican music

== Professional wrestling ==
- Ángel Azteca, a ring name of Mexican professional wrestler Juan Manuel Zúñiga (1963–2007)
- Ángel Azteca Jr., a ring name of a Mexican professional wrestler (real name undisclosed) born 1980, unrelated to the above
- MLW Azteca, a professional wrestling event

== Other uses ==
- Banco Azteca, a financial institution based in Mexico
- Universidad Azteca, a private university in Chalco, Mexico
- Azteca Theater (Fresno, California), listed on the National Register of Historic Places
- Azteca Theater (Houston, Texas), opened 1955 as Houston Theatre, renamed Azteca Theater in 1955, closed 1957
- Fundación Azteca, a Mexican non-profit organization that promotes social responsibility
- Azteca, a character in Antz, a 1998 animated film
- Azteca, a world in Wizard101, an online game

== See also ==
- Aztec (disambiguation)
