= Jupiter Mountain =

Mountain in Colorado, United States

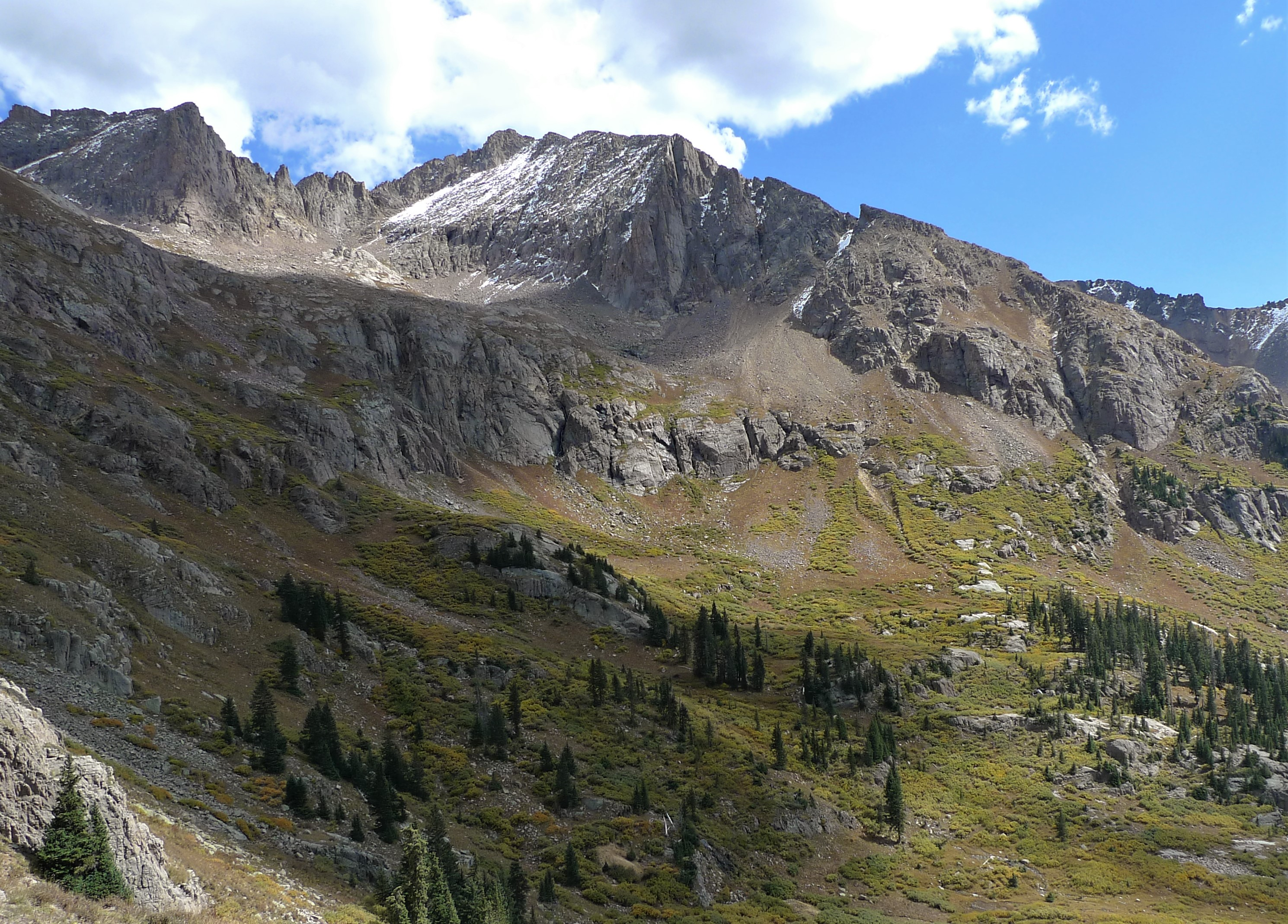
- Northwest aspect, from Chicago Basin

Highest point
- Elevation: 13,836 ft (4,217 m)
- Prominence: 350 ft (107 m)
- Parent peak: Windom Peak
- Isolation: 0.60 mi (0.97 km)
- Coordinates: 37°36′45″N 107°35′31″W

Geography
- Location within Colorado Location within the United States
- Location: La Plata County, Colorado, U.S.
- Parent range: San Juan Mountains, Needle Mountains
- Topo map(s): USGS 7.5' topographic map Columbine Pass, Colorado

Jupiter Mountain is a high mountain summit in the Needle Mountains range of the Rocky Mountains of North America. The 13,836-foot (4,217 m) thirteener is located in the Weminuche Wilderness of San Juan National Forest, 27.7 miles (44.6 km) northeast by north (bearing 33°) of the City of Durango in La Plata County, Colorado, United States.

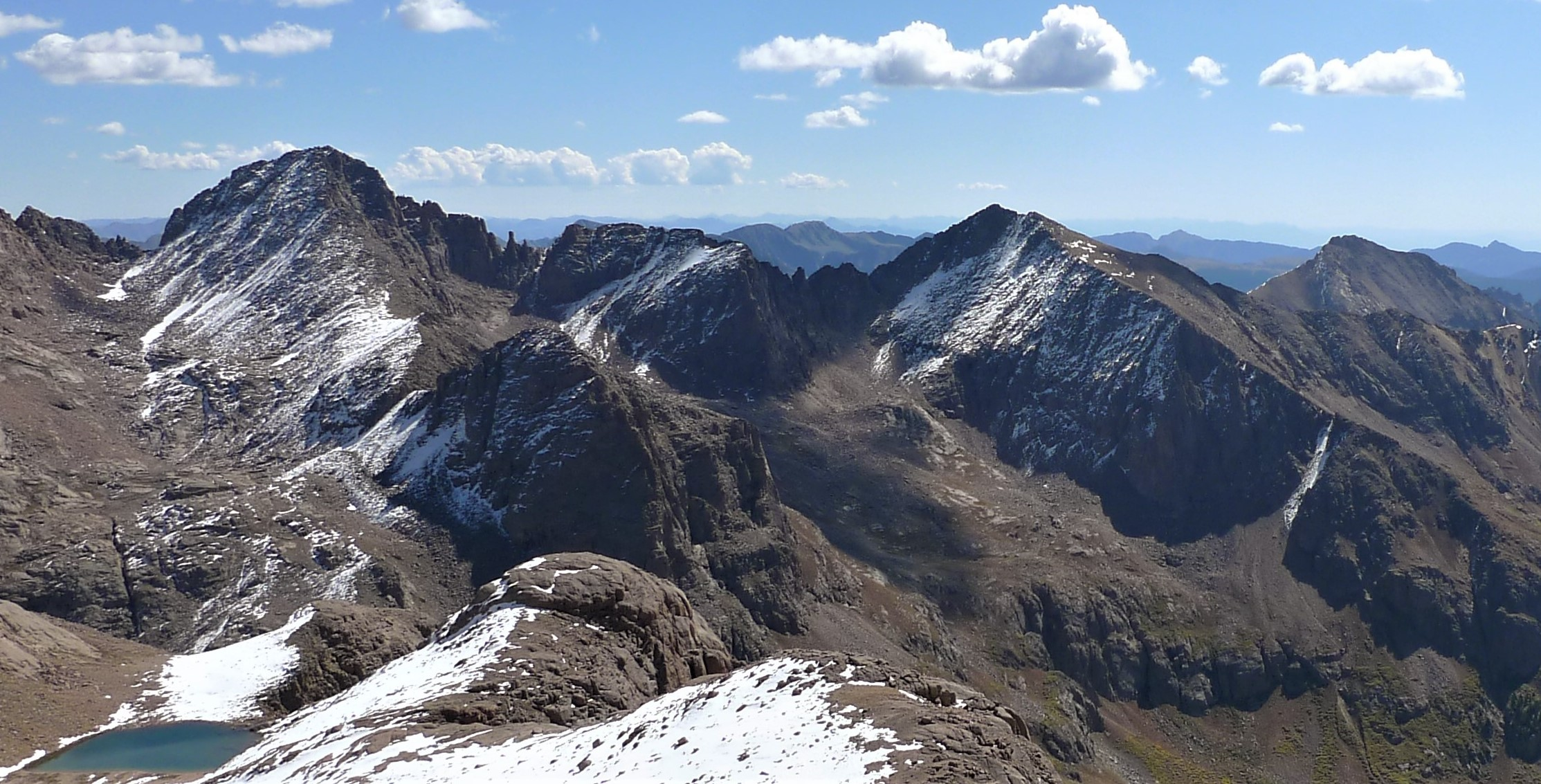
Windom Peak (left) and Jupiter Mountain (right) from the west

== Climate ==
According to the Köppen climate classification system, Jupiter Mountain is located in an alpine subarctic climate zone with cold, snowy winters, and cool to warm summers. Due to its altitude, it receives precipitation all year, as snow in winter, and as thunderstorms in summer, with a dry period in late spring.

== Historical names ==
- Jupiter Mountain – 1972
- Jupiter Peak

== See also ==
- List of Colorado mountain ranges
- List of Colorado mountain summits
  - List of Colorado fourteeners
  - List of Colorado 4000 meter prominent summits
  - List of the most prominent summits of Colorado
- List of Colorado county high points
