= Aztec (disambiguation) =

The Aztecs were a Mesoamerican civilization that flourished in central Mexico from 1300 to 1521.

Aztec or Aztek may also refer to:

- The Aztec Empire
- The Nahuatl language, also known as "Aztec"

== Brands and products ==
- Aztec (chocolate), a chocolate bar manufactured by Cadbury plc

== Computing ==
- Aztec C, a C compiler for a variety of older computing platforms
- Aztec Code, a two-dimensional barcode

== Entertainment and media ==
- Aztec (video game), a game for the Apple II personal computer
- Aztec Adventure: The Golden Road to Paradise, a game for the Sega Master System console
- Aztek (character), a character in the DC Universe
- Aztec (novel), a novel by Gary Jennings
- Aztec Camera, a Scottish new wave band of the 1980s and mid-1990s
- Aztek Escobar, a rapper
- Billy Thorpe & the Aztecs, an Australian rock band of the 1960s and 1970s
- The Aztecs (Doctor Who), a serial in the Doctor Who television series
- "Aztecs", a 1977 short story by Vonda N. McIntyre

== Honors ==
- Order of the Aztec Eagle, highest honor accorded foreigners by the Mexican government

== Organizations and orders ==
- Aztec Club of 1847, an hereditary order for US Army officers who served in the Mexican–American War
- Aztec Resources, merged with Mount Gibson Iron in 2006, operated the iron ore mine on Koolan Island, Western Australia
- Barrio Azteca, a Mexican-American gang

== Places ==
- Aztec Mountain (Colorado), a summit in Colorado, US
- Aztec, New Mexico, a city in the United States

== Sports ==
- Los Angeles Aztecs, a soccer team that competed in the North American Soccer League from 1974 to 1981
- San Diego State Aztecs, the collegiate athletics and sports teams for San Diego State University

== Transportation ==
- Aztec, a steam yacht launched in 1902 and renamed HMCS Beaver in 1917
- SS Aztec, a cargo steamship launched in 1894 and sunk in 1917
- Piper Aztec, a small twin-engine aircraft
- Pontiac Aztek, a sport utility vehicle
- Aztec GT, Aztec II, Aztec 7, kit car models made by Fiberfab

== See also ==
- Azteca (disambiguation)
