= Aztec Mountain (Colorado) =

Mountain in Colorado, United States

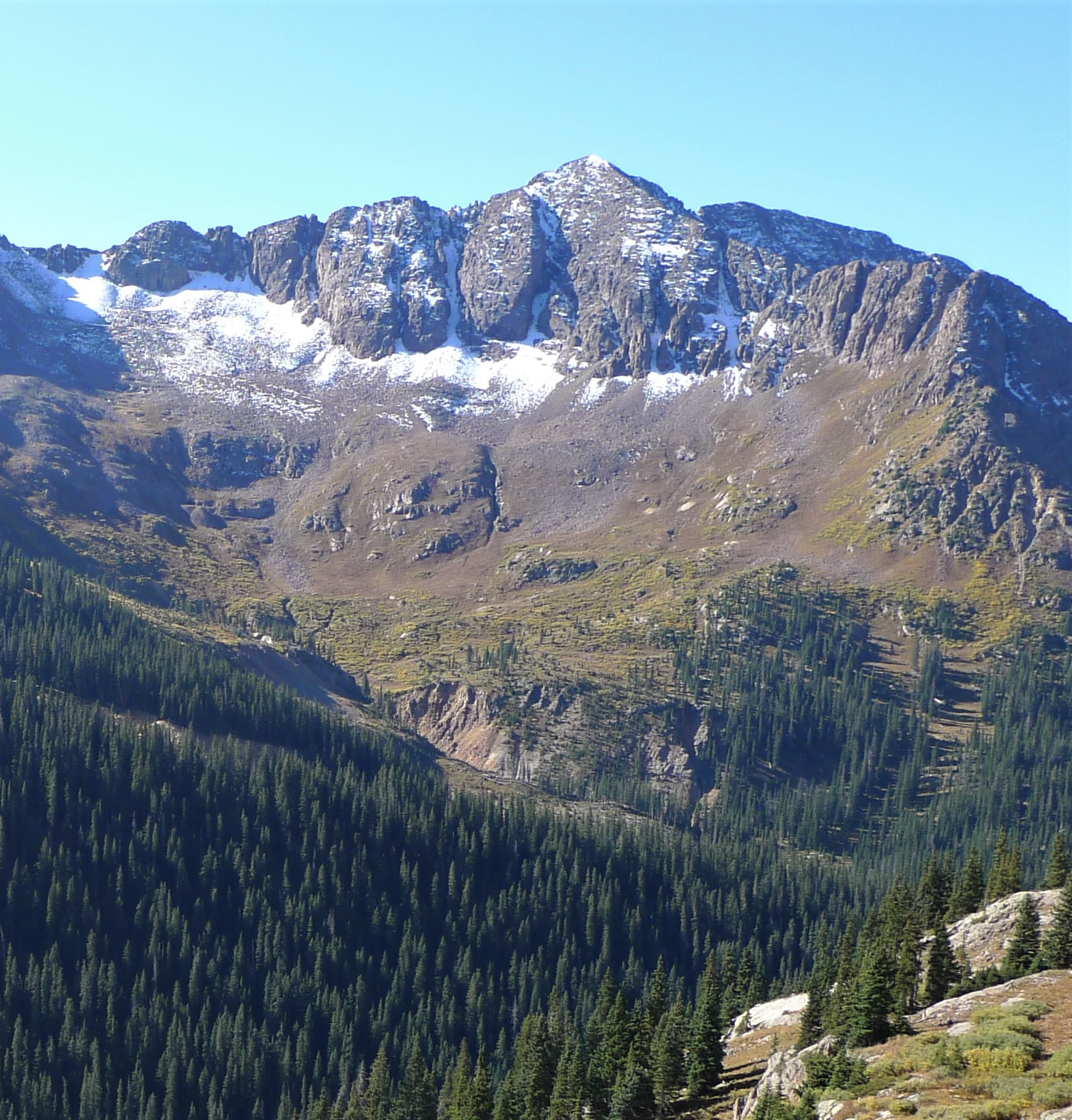
- North aspect

Highest point
- Elevation: 13,310 ft (4,057 m)
- Prominence: 617 ft (188 m)
- Parent peak: Jupiter Mountain (13,836 ft)
- Isolation: 1.95 mi (3.14 km)
- Coordinates: 37°35′30″N 107°36′57″W

Geography
- Location within Colorado Location within the United States
- Country: United States
- State: Colorado
- County: La Plata County
- Protected area: Weminuche Wilderness
- Parent range: Rocky Mountains; San Juan Mountains; Needle Mountains
- Topo map: USGS Columbine Pass

Climbing
- Easiest route: class 2+

Aztec Mountain is a 13,310-foot (4,057 m) summit in La Plata County, Colorado, United States.

== Description ==
Aztec Mountain is situated in the Needle Mountains which are a subrange of the San Juan Mountains. The remote mountain is located 27 miles (43 km) north-northeast of the community of Durango and set in the Weminuche Wilderness on land managed by San Juan National Forest. Precipitation runoff from the mountain's north slopes drain to Needle Creek which is a tributary of the Animas River and the south slope drains to the Florida River via Missouri Gulch. Topographic relief is significant as the summit rises 2,500 feet (762 m) above Needle Creek in 0.8 miles (1.3 km). The mountain's toponym has been officially adopted by the United States Board on Geographic Names, and has been recorded in publications since at least 1906.

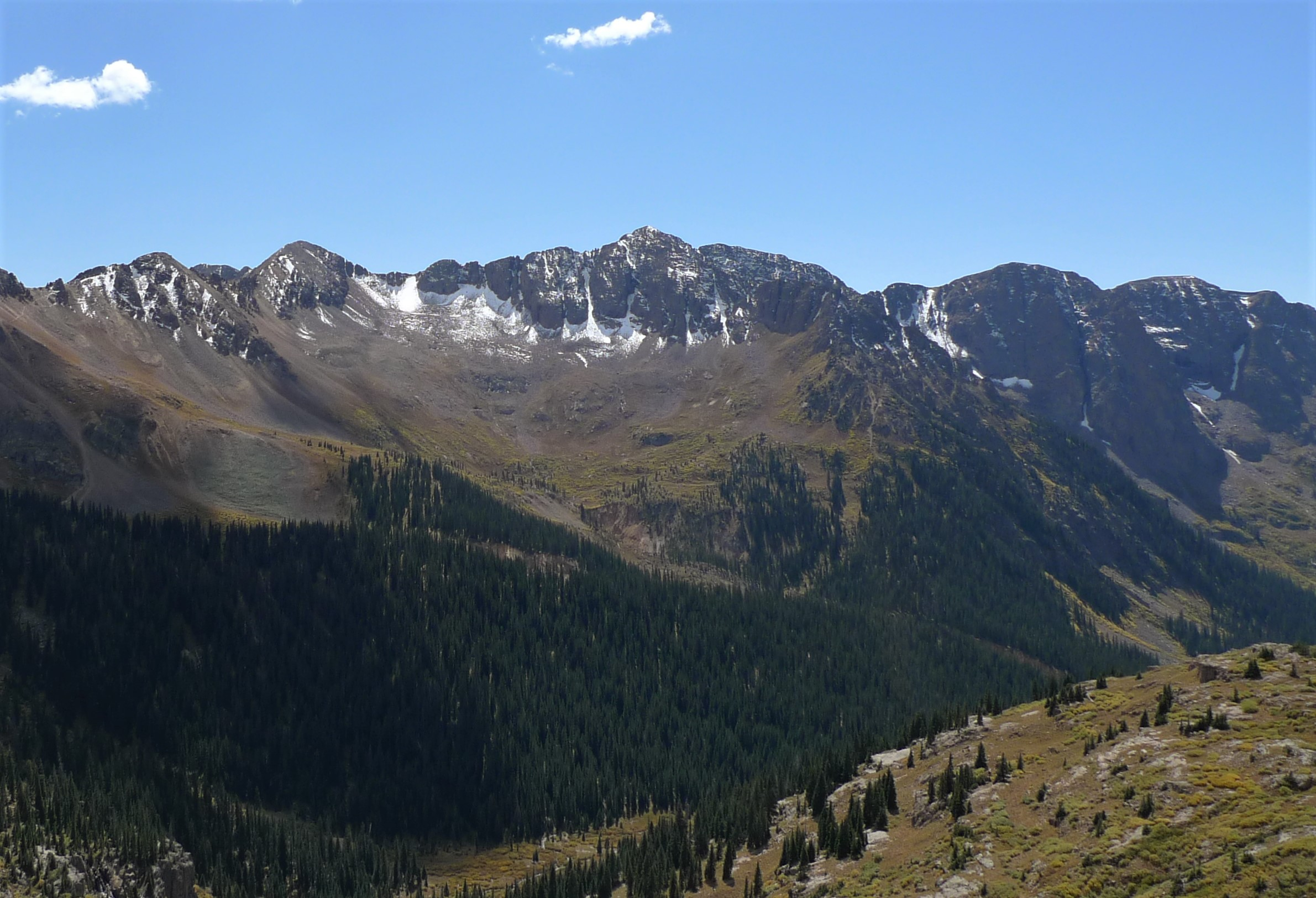
Aztec Mountain from the north

== Climate ==
According to the Köppen climate classification system, Aztec Mountain is located in an alpine subarctic climate zone with cold, snowy winters, and cool to warm summers. Due to its altitude, it receives precipitation all year, as snow in winter and as thunderstorms in summer, with a dry period in late spring. Climbers can expect afternoon rain, hail, and lightning from the seasonal monsoon in late July and August.

== See also ==
- List of mountain peaks of Colorado
- Thirteener
