= Sunlight Peak =

Mountain in the state of Colorado

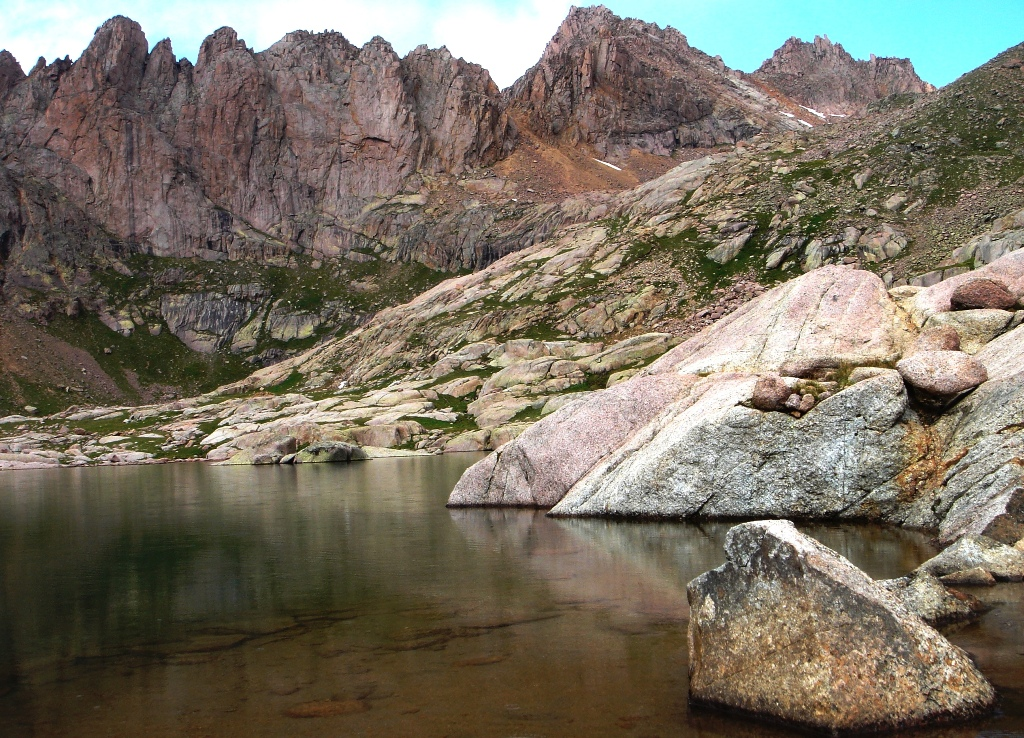
- Sunlight Peak from Twin Lakes

Highest point
- Elevation: 14,059.0 ft (4,285.2 m); NAPGD2022
- Prominence: 399 ft (122 m)
- Isolation: 0.48 mi (0.77 km)
- Listing: Colorado Fourteener 39th
- Coordinates: 37°37′38″N 107°35′45″W

Geography
- Location within Colorado
- Location: La Plata County, Colorado, U.S.
- Parent range: San Juan Mountains, Needle Mountains
- Topo map(s): USGS 7.5' topographic map Storm King Peak, Colorado

Climbing
- Easiest route: South Face: Climb, class 4

Sunlight Peak is a high mountain summit of the Needle Mountains range of the Rocky Mountains of North America. The 14,059.0-foot (4,285 m) fourteener is located in the Weminuche Wilderness of San Juan National Forest, 28.5 miles (45.8 km) northeast by north (bearing 32°) of the City of Durango in La Plata County, Colorado, United States.

Sunlight Peak was so named in 1902; the name is likely descriptive.

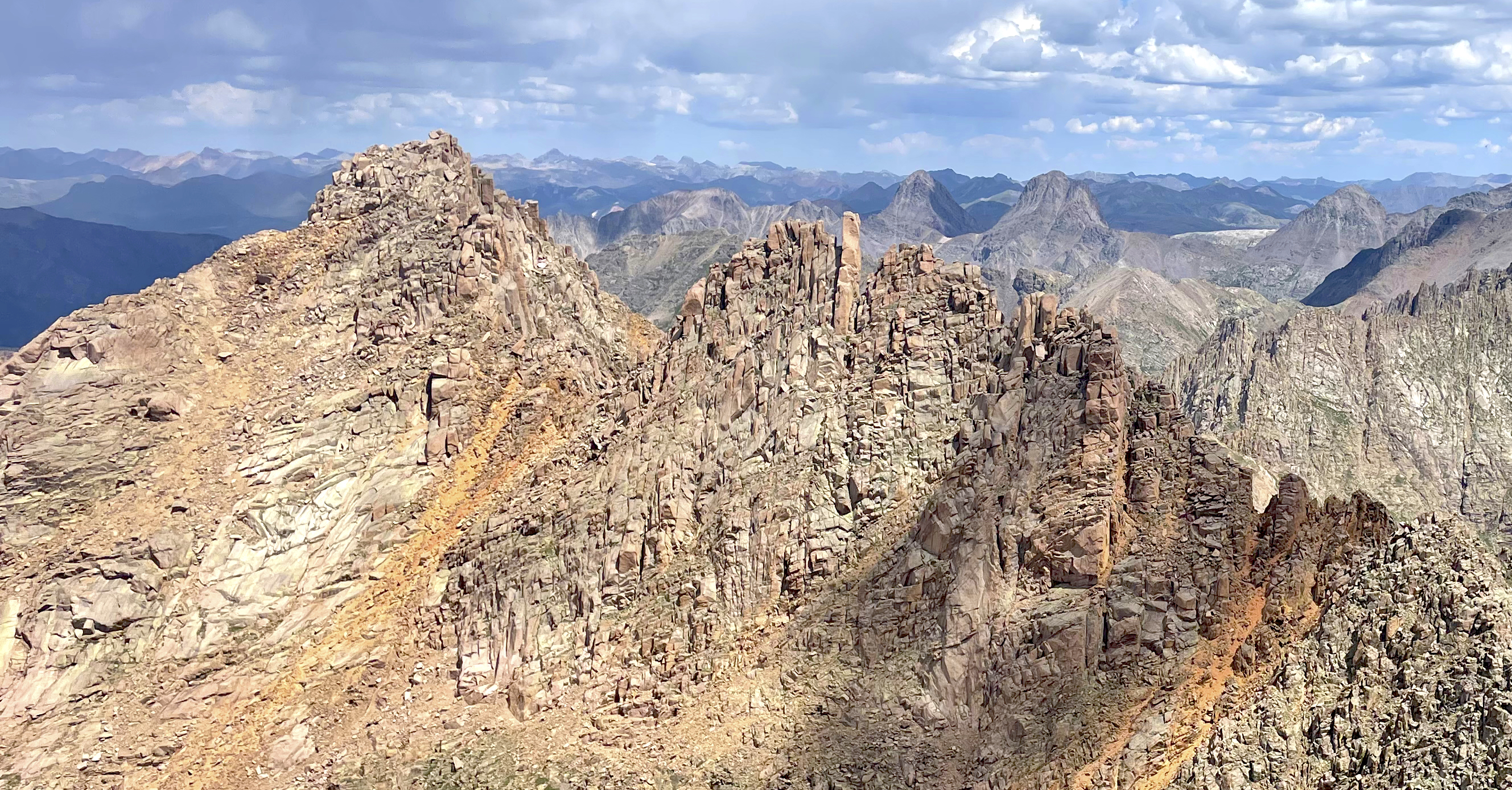
Sunlight Peak from Windom Peak

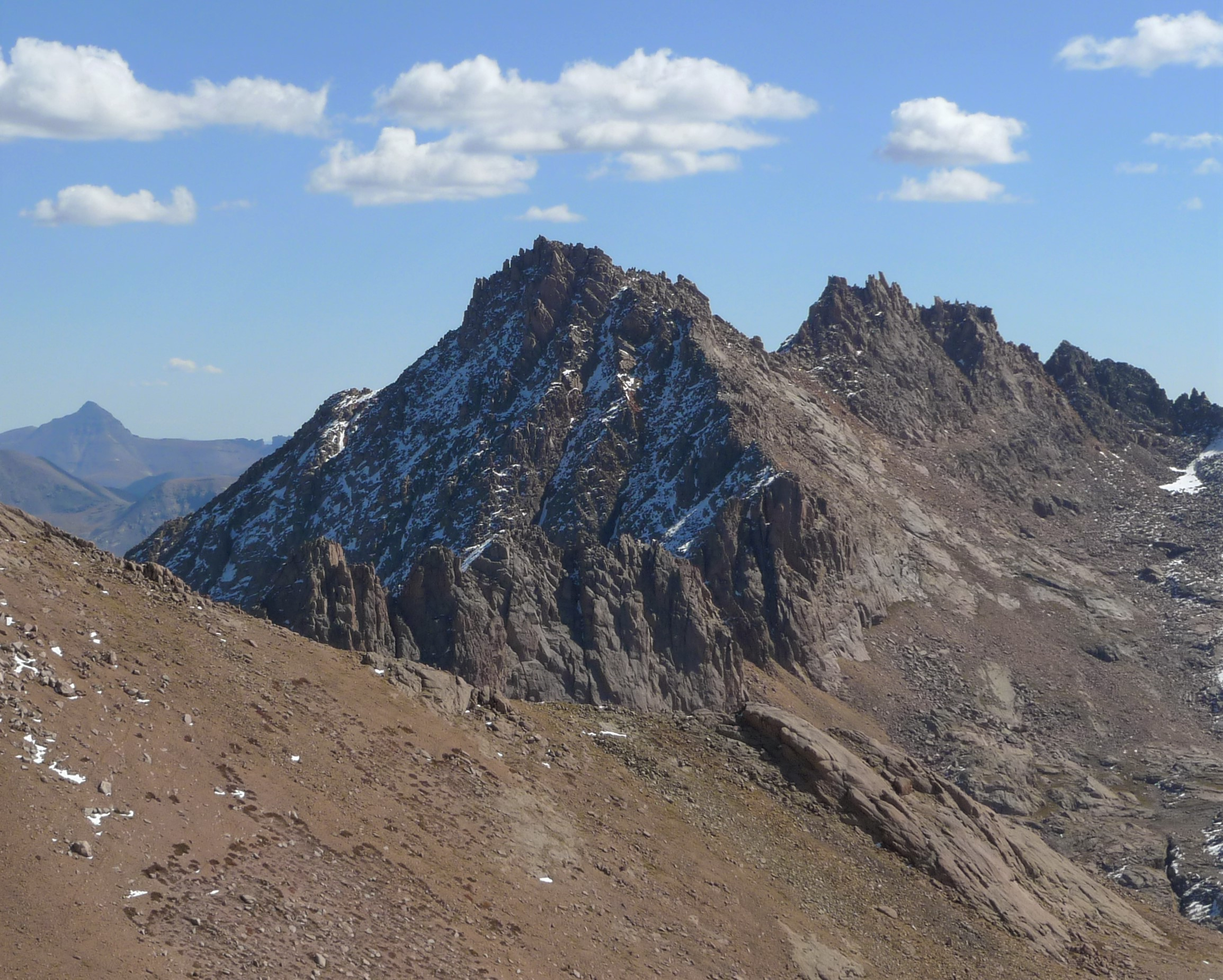
West aspect

== Climbing ==
Sunlight Peak is one of three fourteeners in the Needle Mountains; the other two are Mount Eolus and Windom Peak. Windom and Sunlight lie on the east side of Twin Lakes, in upper Chicago Basin, while Eolus lies on the west side. All three peaks are relatively remote by Colorado standards, and have a strong wilderness character; however they can be popular in summer.

The standard route up Sunlight Peak is from the south, known as the "Red Couloir". It is a non-technical scramble, but achieving the top of the summit block does require an exposed rock climbing move.

== Climate ==
According to the Köppen climate classification system, Sunlight Peak is located in an alpine subarctic climate zone with cold, snowy winters, and cool to warm summers. Due to its altitude, it receives precipitation all year, as snow in winter, and as thunderstorms in summer, with a dry period in late spring.

== See also ==
- List of mountain peaks of Colorado
  - List of Colorado fourteeners
