= Mount Eolus =

Mountain in Colorado, United States

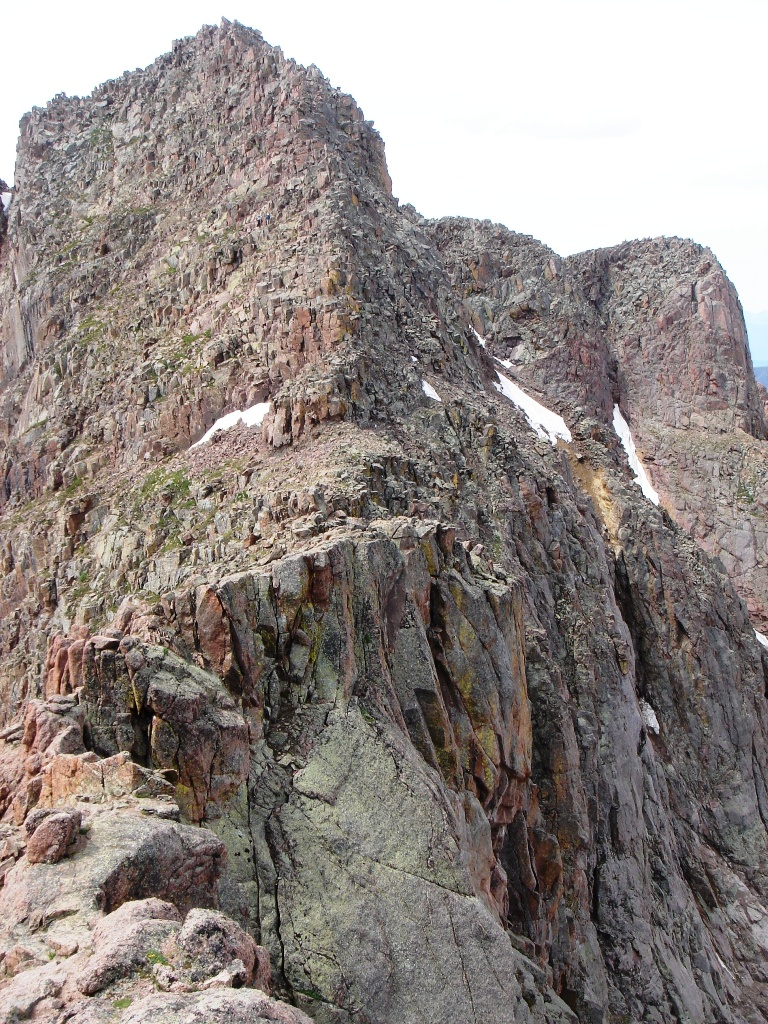
- Mount Eolus

Highest point
- Elevation: 14,085.0 ft (4,293.1 m); NAPGD2022
- Prominence: 1,024 ft (312 m)
- Isolation: 1.69 mi (2.72 km)
- Listing: Colorado fourteeners 33rd
- Coordinates: 37°37′18″N 107°37′22″W

Geography
- Location within Colorado
- Location: La Plata County, Colorado, U.S.
- Parent range: San Juan Mountains, Needle Mountains
- Topo map(s): USGS 7.5' topographic map Columbine Pass, Colorado

Climbing
- Easiest route: Northeast Ridge: Scramble, class 3

Mount Eolus is a high mountain summit of the Needle Mountains range of the Rocky Mountains of North America. The 14,085-foot (4,293 m) fourteener is located in the Weminuche Wilderness of San Juan National Forest, 27.4 miles (44.1 km) northeast by north (bearing 29°) of the City of Durango in La Plata County, Colorado, United States.

Named after the Greek god of the wind, the mountain was originally referred to as "Aeolus" in the 1874 Hayden Survey. The current spelling of "Eolus" was first used in the Wheeler Survey of 1878.

== Climbing ==
Mount Eolus is one of three fourteeners in the Needle Mountains; the others are Sunlight Peak and Windom Peak. All three peaks are located around the cirque known as Upper Chicago Basin. Eolus lies to the west of the upper basin, while the other peaks lie on the east side. These mountains are among the most remote of Colorado's fourteeners and have a strong wilderness character.

North Eolus, elevation 14,045 ft (4,281 m), is a northern subpeak of Mount Eolus, though it is not usually counted as a separate peak or as an official fourteener, since it has a topographic prominence of only 179 ft (55 m). It is sometimes climbed in conjunction with Eolus.

== Climate ==
Climate data for Mount Eolus 37.6271 N, 107.6151 W, Elevation: 13,333 ft (4,064 m) (1991–2020 normals)
Month	Jan	Feb	Mar	Apr	May	Jun	Jul	Aug	Sep	Oct	Nov	Dec	Year
Mean daily maximum °F (°C)	25.2 (−3.8)	24.9 (−3.9)	29.4 (−1.4)	34.2 (1.2)	42.6 (5.9)	54.2 (12.3)	58.6 (14.8)	56.5 (13.6)	50.8 (10.4)	41.4 (5.2)	31.8 (−0.1)	25.4 (−3.7)	39.6 (4.2)
Daily mean °F (°C)	13.3 (−10.4)	12.6 (−10.8)	16.8 (−8.4)	21.3 (−5.9)	29.9 (−1.2)	40.5 (4.7)	45.4 (7.4)	43.9 (6.6)	38.2 (3.4)	29.0 (−1.7)	20.3 (−6.5)	13.8 (−10.1)	27.1 (−2.7)
Mean daily minimum °F (°C)	1.4 (−17.0)	0.4 (−17.6)	4.1 (−15.5)	8.4 (−13.1)	17.2 (−8.2)	26.9 (−2.8)	32.2 (0.1)	31.2 (−0.4)	25.5 (−3.6)	16.6 (−8.6)	8.8 (−12.9)	2.3 (−16.5)	14.6 (−9.7)
Average precipitation inches (mm)	4.80 (122)	4.95 (126)	4.65 (118)	4.72 (120)	3.52 (89)	1.30 (33)	2.46 (62)	3.99 (101)	3.19 (81)	3.99 (101)	4.54 (115)	4.99 (127)	47.1 (1,195)
Source: PRISM Climate Group

== See also ==
- List of mountain peaks of North America
  - List of mountain peaks of the United States
    - List of mountain peaks of Colorado
      - List of Colorado fourteeners

== Gallery ==
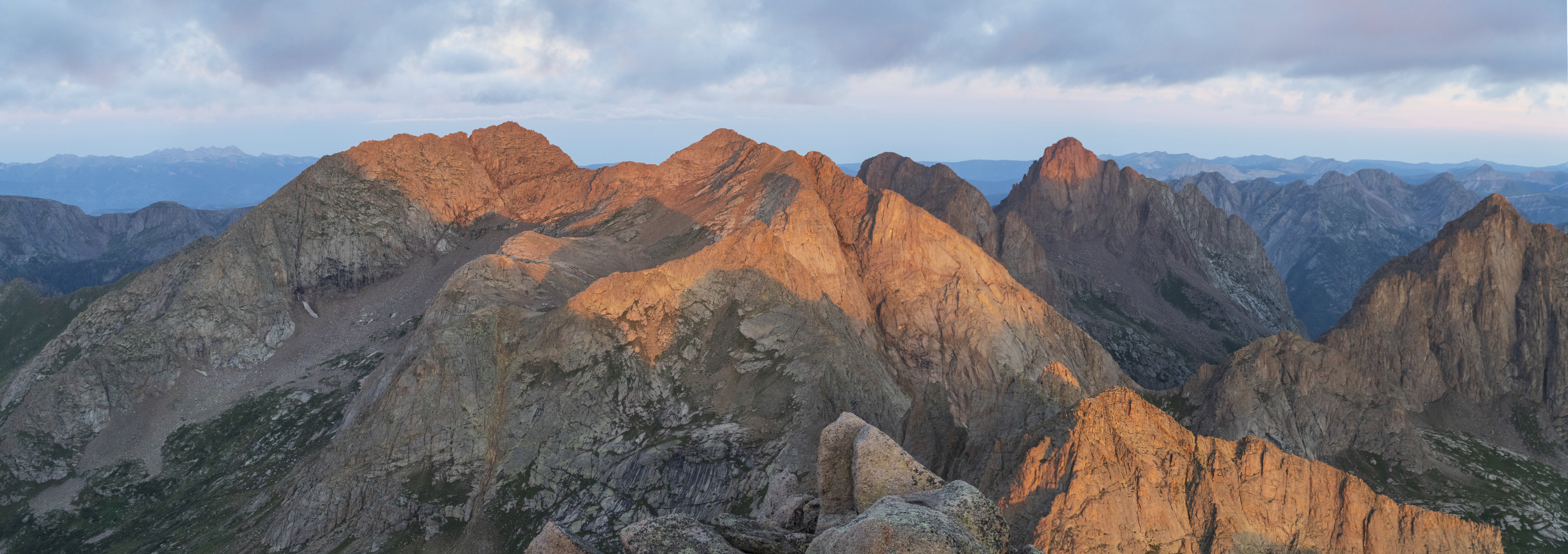
Mount Eolus seen from Sunlight Peak.

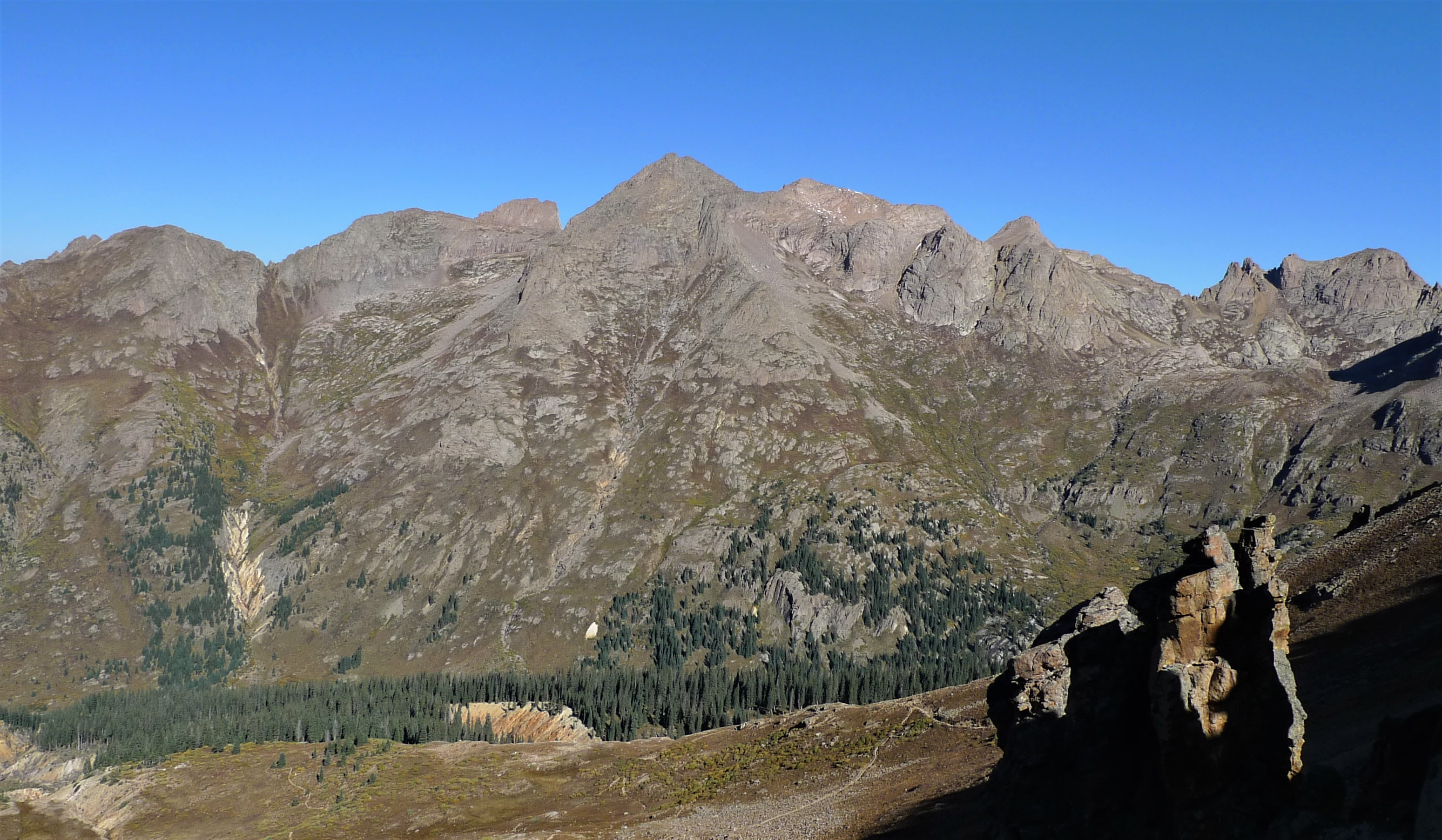
Southeast aspect

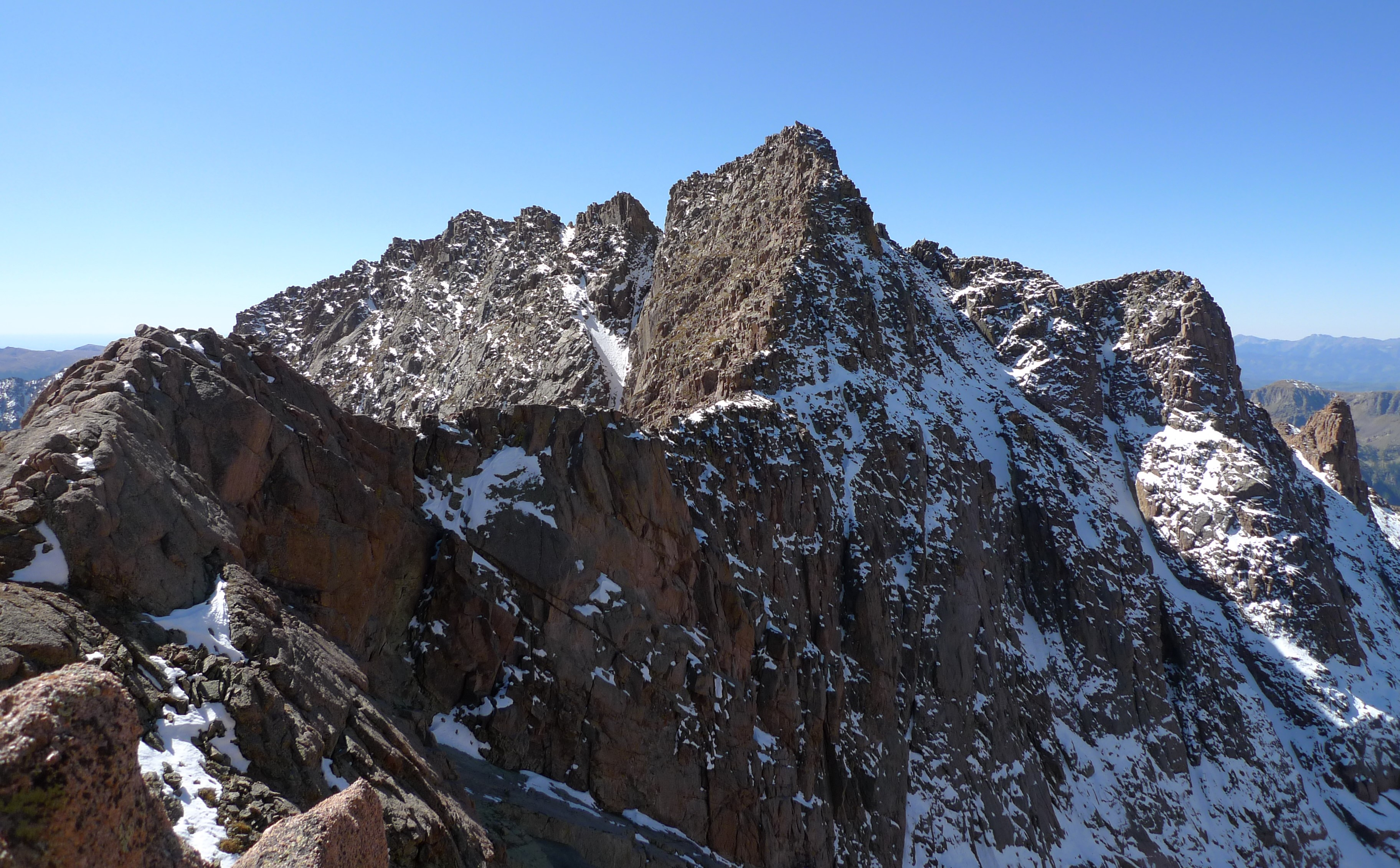
Summit
