= Chicago Basin =

Watershed in Colorado, United States

Coordinates: 37°36′35″N 107°36′34″W

Chicago Basin comprises the upper portion of the Needle Creek watershed in the Needle Mountains (Colorado), a subrange of the San Juan Mountains in the US State of Colorado. It lies within the Weminuche Wilderness, part of the San Juan National Forest. Needle Creek is an east-side tributary of the Animas River. The basin is a popular destination in summer for climbers and backpackers. The upper portion of the basin is surrounded by three fourteeners: Mount Eolus, Windom Peak, and Sunlight Peak. Columbine Pass lies to the east of the lower basin.

The standard route of access to Chicago Basin is somewhat unusual. The Durango and Silverton Narrow Gauge Railroad, driven by a historical steam locomotive, runs through the canyon of the Animas River. It makes a stop (when requested) at Needleton, a location near the confluence of Needle Creek and the Animas. Visitors to Chicago Basin typically ride the train from Durango or Silverton, get off at Needleton, and hike about 6 miles up Needle Creek to the basin itself. There are mountain goats at Chicago Basin. Many backpackers continue over Columbine Pass to the watershed of Vallecito Creek.
