= Windom Peak =

Mountain in the state of Colorado

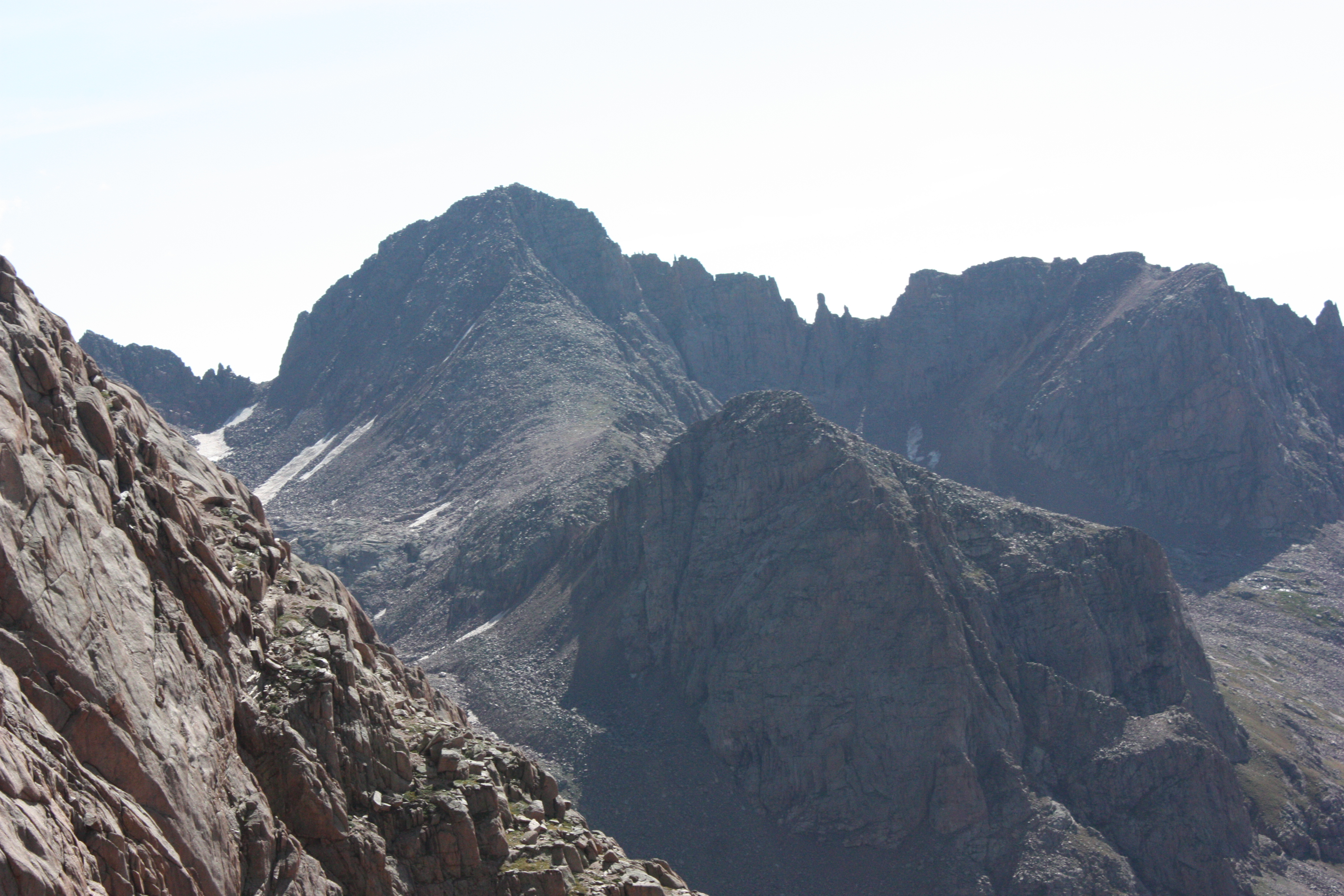
- Windom Peak (left center) from across Chicago Basin.

Highest point
- Elevation: 4,293.72-metre (14,087 ft); NAPGD2022
- Prominence: 2187 ft (667 m)
- Isolation: 26.3 mi (42.4 km)
- Listing: North America highest peaks 54th; US highest major peaks 40th; Colorado highest major peaks 21st; Colorado fourteeners 32nd; Colorado county high points 18th
- Coordinates: 37°37′16″N 107°35′31″W

Geography
- Location within Colorado
- Location: High point of La Plata County, Colorado, United States
- Parent range: San Juan Mountains, Highest summit of the Needle Mountains
- Topo map(s): USGS 7.5' topographic map Columbine Pass, Colorado

Climbing
- Easiest route: West Ridge: Hike, class 2

Windom Peak is the highest summit of the Needle Mountains range of the Rocky Mountains of North America. The prominent 4,293.72-metre (14,087 ft) fourteener is located in the Weminuche Wilderness of San Juan National Forest, 28.2 miles (45.4 km) northeast by north (bearing 32°) of the City of Durango in La Plata County, Colorado, United States. The summit of Windom Peak is the highest point in La Plata County and the entire San Juan River drainage basin. The mountain was named in honor of Minnesota senator William Windom.

== Climbing ==
Windom Peak is one of three fourteeners in the Needle Mountains; the other two are Mount Eolus and Sunlight Peak. Windom and Sunlight lie on the east side of Twin Lakes, in upper Chicago Basin, while Eolus lies on the west side. All three peaks are relatively remote by Colorado standards, and have a strong wilderness character; however they can be popular in summer.

The standard route up Windom Peak is rated class 2.

== Historical names ==
- Windom Mountain
- Windom Peak – 1974

== See also ==
- List of mountain peaks of North America
  - List of mountain peaks of the United States
    - List of mountain peaks of Colorado
      - List of Colorado county high points
      - List of Colorado fourteeners
