= Azteca Theater (Fresno, California) =

Historic theater in Fresno, California

Coordinates: 36.7290°N 119.7933°W

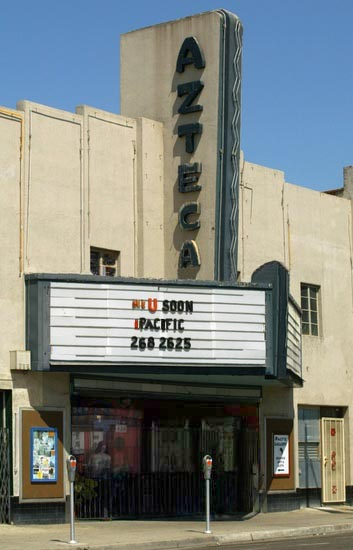
Theatro Azteca, 2006

The Azteca Theater (Teatro Azteca) is a historic Art Deco theater in the Chinatown district of Fresno, California, built by Gustavo Acosta in 1948. The theater was the first Spanish language cinema in the San Joaquin Valley, serving a growing population of Mexican-Americans in California's Central Valley. It was listed on the National Register of Historic Places in 2017.

== History ==
The theater was designed by Fresno firm, Johnson & Moore Consulting Engineers who designed the Biola Theater and Johnson was involved earlier in some of the facade work on the Warnors Theater in Fresno. It officially opened on 30 November 1948.

In 1956 Acosta leased the Azteca Theater to Arturo Tirado who is closely associated with the theater and entertainment in the Hispanic community into the 1980s when he retired. In 1961 Tirado was President of the Spanish Pictures Exhibitors Association representing 300 movie theaters in the United States. His father Romualdo Tirado was well known in California theater and a Cantinflas.

Known as the Golden Age of Mexican Cinema, Cantinflas, Pedro Infante, María Félix, Agustín Lara, Pedro Vargas, Miguel Aceves Mejía, Pedro Armendáriz, Antonio Aguilar and José Alfredo Jiménez were among the luminaries seen at the Azteca Theater.

Besides popular films from the Mexican Cinema, singers and theatrical acts frequented the stage. The theater was a rallying point for César Chávez on 24 March 1966 when he made his march from Delano to Sacramento.

The Azteca closed in the late 1980s and was partially reopening in 1999 with an art gallery and events. In 2014, the theater was restored.

== Architecture ==
The Azteca Theater is a 2-story brick masonry building constructed in a late Art Deco style. A statue of Bruce Lee stands in the lobby, a hint of the fact that the theater would also play kung-fu movies. The walls of the dressing room in the backstage have signatures of many artists that performed in the theater.

The wooden organ pipes that were part of the theater are now on display on the walls of the next door bar, A Love letter to Fresno.

== See also ==
- Azteca Theater (Houston, Texas)
- History of Mexican Americans
- Californios
