= Weminuche Wilderness =

Protected area in southwestern Colorado, US

- IUCN category Ib (wilderness area)
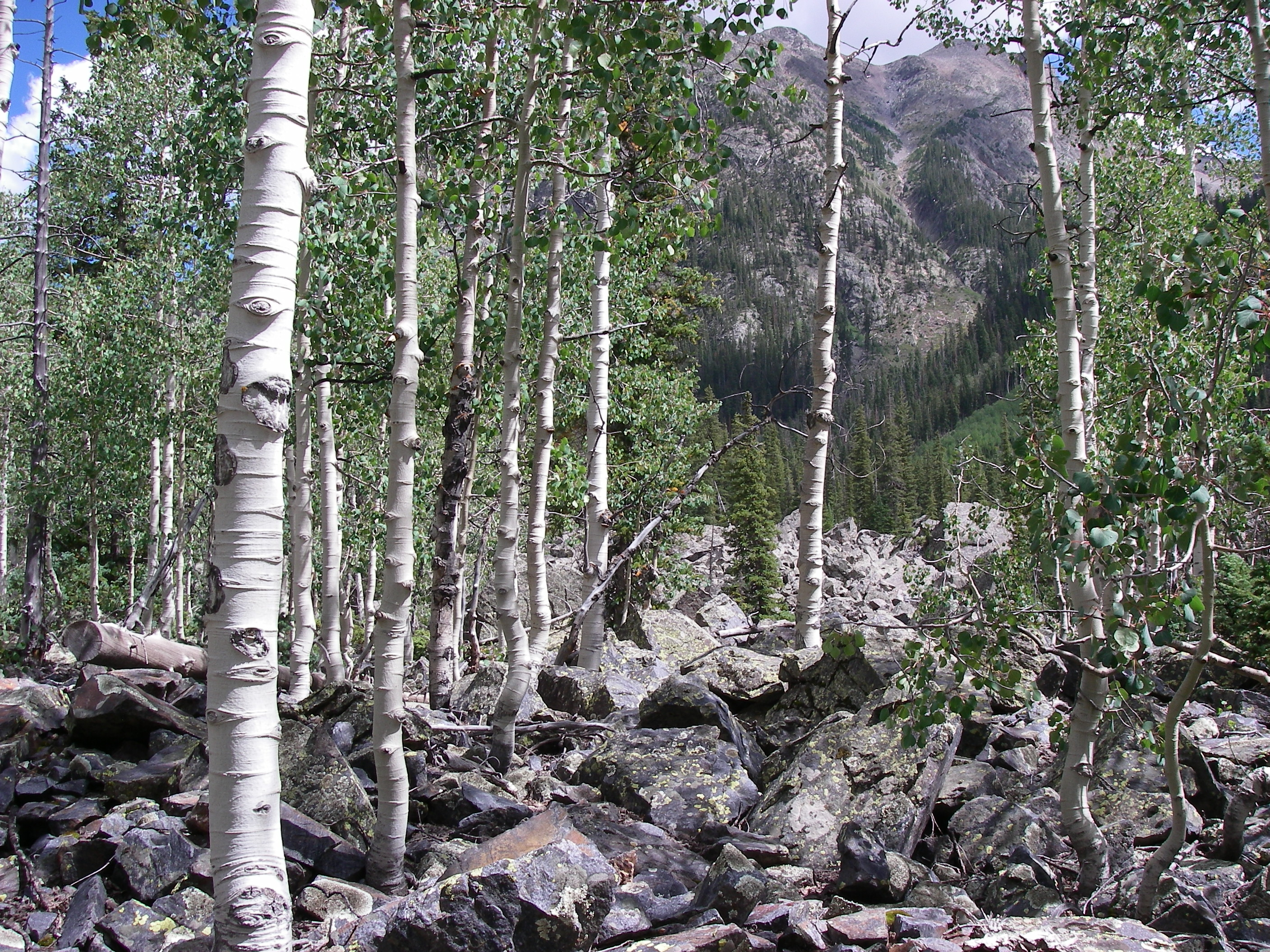
- Aspen in the Weminuche Wilderness

- Location within the United States
- Location: Colorado, USA
- Nearest city: South Fork, CO
- Coordinates: 37°40′N 107°30′W
- Area: 499,771 acres (202,250 ha)
- Established: 1975
- Governing body: U.S. Forest Service

The Weminuche Wilderness is a wilderness area in southwest Colorado managed by the United States Forest Service as part of the San Juan National Forest on the west side of the Continental Divide and the Rio Grande National Forest on the east side of the divide. The Weminuche Wilderness was designated by Congress in 1975, and expanded by the Colorado Wilderness Acts of 1980 and 1993. It is located 4 miles (6.4 km) southeast of the town of Silverton, 17 miles (27 km) northeast of Durango, and 8 miles (13 km) west of South Fork. At 499,771 acres (2,022.50 km^{2}), it is the largest wilderness area in the state of Colorado. Elevation in the wilderness ranges from 7,700 feet (2,300 m) along the Animas River to 14,093 feet (4,296 m) at the summit of Windom Peak.

The Weminuche Wilderness is dissected by a narrow north-south corridor within the Animas River Gorge through which the Durango and Silverton Narrow Gauge Railroad travels between Silverton and Durango. To the west of this corridor are the West Needle Mountains. To the east lie the Needle Mountains and the bulk of the wilderness. Two train stops within the gorge allow hikers access into the Needle Mountains.

The Wilderness was named after the Weminuche Native Americans.

== Geology ==
The surface geology of the Weminuche Wilderness is characterized by two geologic provinces. The western third of the wilderness is within the Needle Mountains Proterozoic complex while the remainder of the wilderness is within the San Juan volcanic field.

The Laramide Orogeny, which began approximately 80 million years ago in the Late Cretaceous, resulted in significant regional uplift. A dome 100 miles (160 km) wide lifted rock more than 10,000 feet (3,048 m) in the western third of the wilderness. Pushed up were Proterozoic igneous and metamorphic rock and overlying, younger Paleozoic and Mesozoic sedimentary rock, as well as Cenozoic volcanic rock. Erosion has removed the overlying rock and today the Proterozoic rock is exposed, forming the high, jagged, Needle Mountains. The highest peaks in the wilderness are in the Needle Mountains. These peaks include three fourteeners: Windom Peak, Mount Eolus, and Sunlight Peak. Eolus granite is a common rock in the Needle Mountains and these fourteeners are composed of this intrusive igneous rock.

To the east lies the San Juan volcanic field. While this region was also uplifted during the Laramide Orogeny, additional mountain building occurred as Tertiary volcanism deposited lava and ash, which in some places was over 6,000 feet (1,829 m) thick. These volcanic rocks overlay Cretaceous sedimentary rock, which is exposed in only a few places on the southern edge of the wilderness.

The Weminuche Wilderness was glaciated during the Pleistocene and the current landscape is dominated by glacial landforms including horns, arêtes, cirques, tarns, moraines, and U-shaped valleys.

== Flora and fauna ==
At lower elevations, particularly along the southern side of the wilderness, are montane forests with stands of ponderosa pine and Douglas fir and thickets of Gambel oak. Higher and widespread through the wilderness are subalpine forests dominated by Engelmann spruce and subalpine fir. Stands of aspen occur in the wilderness on historically disturbed sites in both the montane and subalpine zones. Above tree line, which in the wilderness is at an elevation of about 11,500 feet (3,500 m), is alpine tundra dominated by grasses and forbs, along with extensive thickets of willow.

Infestations of spruce beetle have ravaged the Engelmann spruce within the wilderness. Substantial outbreaks began in the late 1990s and have general moved from southeast to northwest through the wilderness. As of 2017, over 120,000 acres (490 km^{2}) of forest had been impacted. In places, particularly in older stands, the kill has been nearly 100%.

The wilderness is known for its herds of elk. Other mammals include mule deer, bighorn sheep, moose, marmots, and pikas. Also present are black bears, mountain lions, re-introduced lynx, bobcats, and coyotes. Mountain goats have been introduced in the wilderness and are now common at higher elevations, particularly in the Needle Mountains. There are concerns over the environmental impact of these non-native goats, particularly their harm to native bighorn sheep populations. Current management in the Weminuche Wilderness allows the mountain goats to persist. This is in contrast to active efforts to eliminate or reduce non-native mountain goat populations in other protected areas such as Rocky Mountain National Park, Grand Teton National Park, and Olympic National Park.

== Hiking ==
Travel through the wilderness is limited to those on foot and horseback. There are nearly 500 miles (800 km) of interconnected trails in the wilderness, which provide for multiple options for both day and multi-day trips. Forming the backbone to this network is the Continental Divide Trail, which traverses the wilderness 83 miles (134 km) from Wolf Creek Pass in the southeast to Stony Pass in the northwest. This network of trails is accessed from over 30 trailheads located around the periphery of the wilderness. Two of these trailheads are the Needleton and Elk Park stops on the Durango and Silverton Narrow Gauge Railroad, which provide the most direct access to the highly visited Needle Mountains.

=== Chicago Basin ===
The most popular trail in the wilderness is the Needle Creek Trail (Forest Trail 504) which begins at the Needleton train stop and leads southeast 6 miles (9.7 km) up into Chicago Basin. From Chicago Basin, where camping is permitted, climbers can reach three fourteeners (Windom Peak, Mount Eolus, and Sunlight Peak) and several thirteeners via day hikes. Chicago Basin sees approximately 10,000 visitor use days each year, most seeking to climb one or more fourteeners, and the area can be crowded. Environmental impacts have resulted in use restrictions in the Chicago Basin area that go beyond regulations applied to the wilderness as a whole.

=== Continental Divide Trail ===
Beyond the Chicago Basin area, trails in the wilderness see much less traffic and solitude can be found. The Continental Divide Trail (CDT) is a 3,100-mile (5,000 km) National Scenic Trail that stretches from Mexico to Canada and passes through the length of the Weminuche Wilderness. The CDT enters the wilderness at Wolf Creek Pass on U.S. Highway 160. The trail then weaves northwest 83 miles (134 km) through the wilderness to Stony Pass on San Juan County Road 3 near Silverton. Following the crest of the San Juan Mountains, this trail offers hikers and those on horseback expansive views of nearby peaks and distant mountain ranges. This is a high path with an average elevation of 11,900 feet (3,627 m), and it rarely dips below tree line. Less than a quarter of the trail passes through forest. More common are long stretches across alpine tundra, rocky slopes and ridges, and subalpine meadows. The highpoint of the trail is at 12,850 feet (3,917 m) on the ridge below South River Peak and the lowest point is where the trail drops to the headwaters of the Los Pinos River at 10,500 feet (3,200 m). Altogether, there is 16,400 feet (4,999 m) of elevation gain and 14,700 feet (4,481 m) of elevation loss on a southeast-to-northwest trip.

The Stony Pass Trailhead is on a four-wheel drive road and has limited parking. To facilitate transportation, there are other nearby trailheads that can be used to exit the Weminuche Wilderness. These include the Elk Park train stop, the Molas Pass Trailhead, the Highland Mary Trailhead, and the Silverton Trailhead just outside the town of Silverton.

== Gallery ==
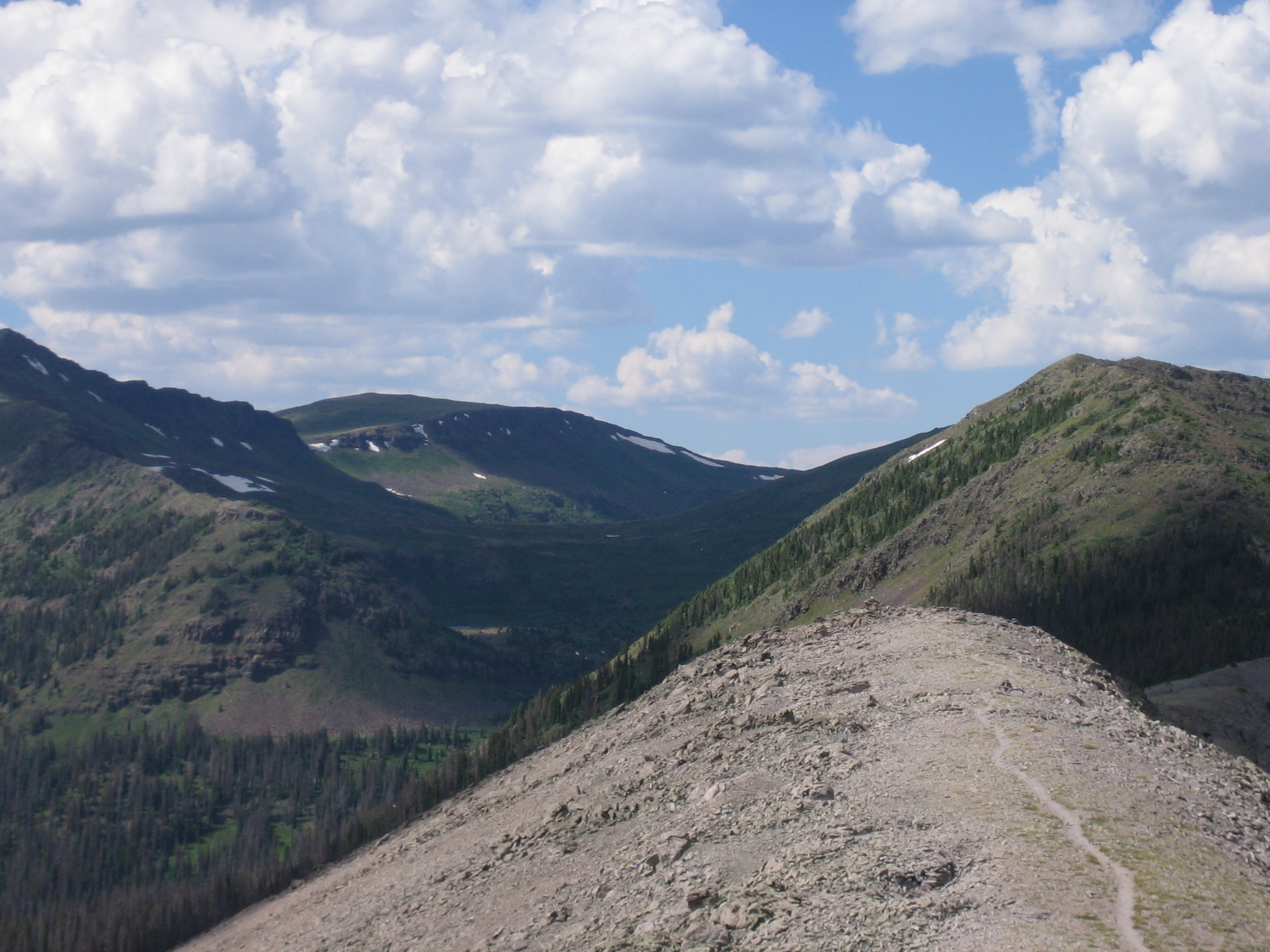
Looking north on the Continental Divide Trail between the Palisade Meadows cutoff and the Knife Edge.

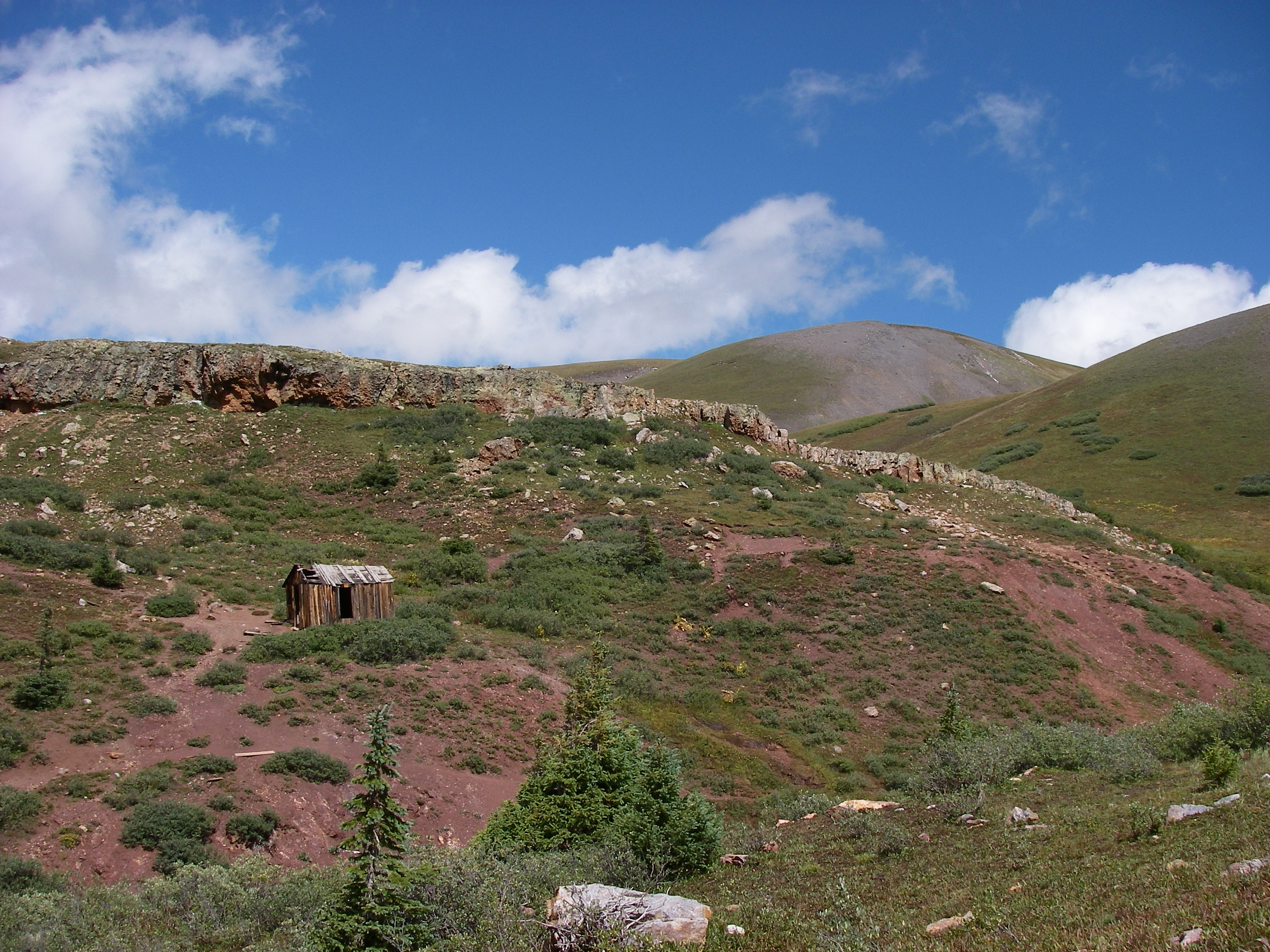
Abandoned mine shack near the Continental Divide Trail.

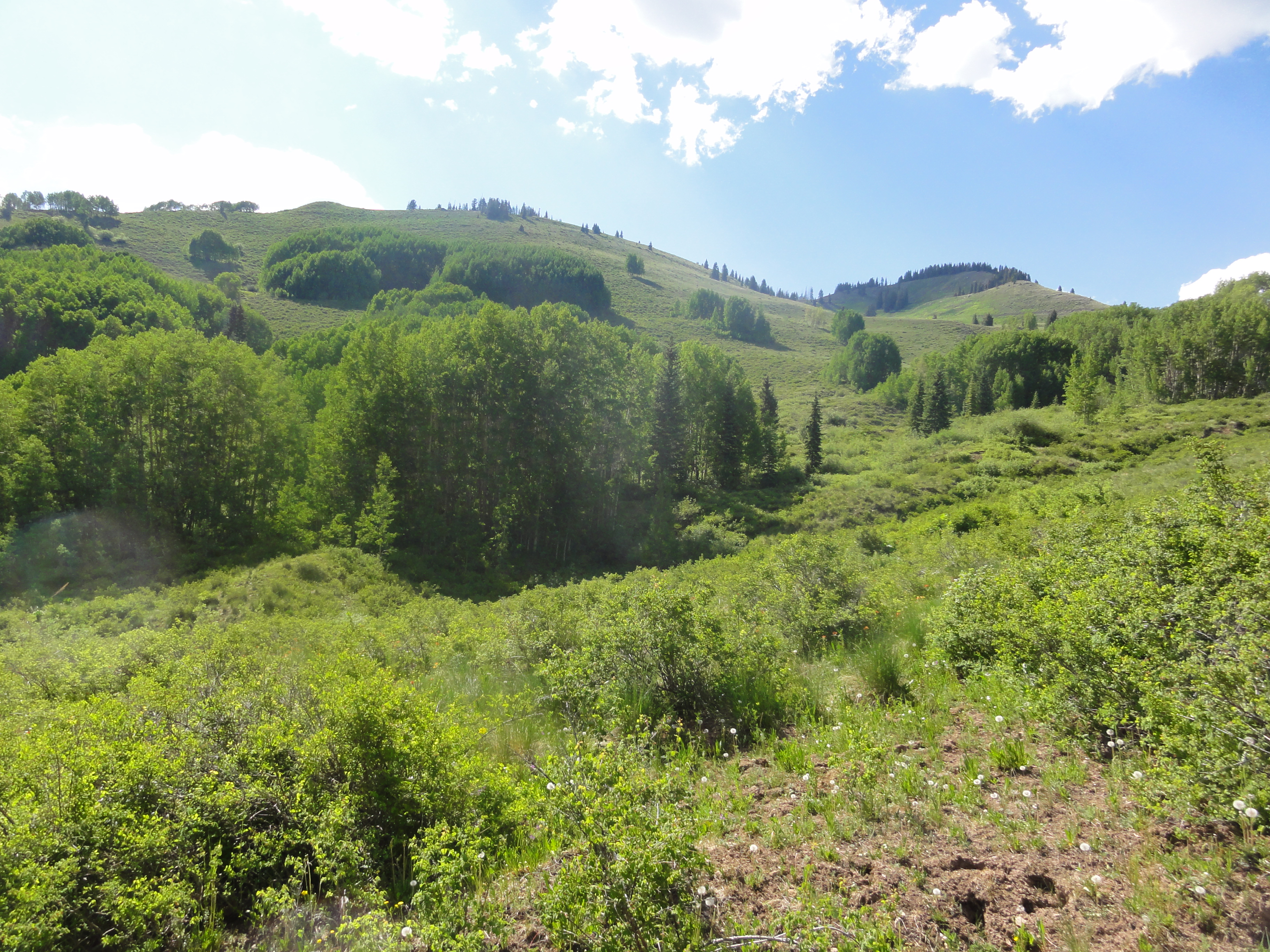
Grassy hills near Lemon Reservoir.
