= Azteca Theater (Houston, Texas) =

Coordinates: 29.7579°N 95.3535°W

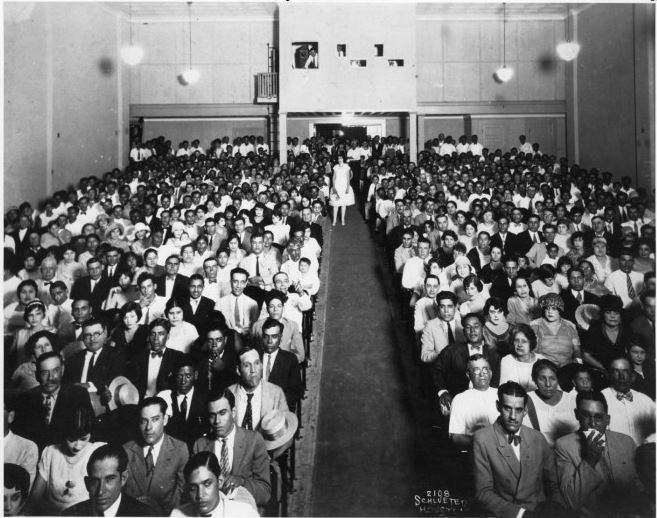
Audience inside the Azteca Theater, Houston, Texas

The Azteca Theater (named the Houston theater from 1927–1955) was a venue to perpetuate the mexican traditions and culture. It was located in Houston Texas from the 1927 to 1955. Among other institutions at the time, this theater helped maintain traditions in Spanish, for the Latino community.

== History ==
Jose Sarabia founded the Azteca Theater in 1927 next to "La Libreria Hispano America," a venue where mexican people congregated in Houston. The Azteca outdid the Hidalgo theater which operated a few blocks away for a short time. The Azteca was one of the most important theaters for the mexican community in the Bayou City

The theater appeared frequently in the pages of La Gaceta Mexicana, a free magazine in Spanish. The theater advertised upcoming shows but also sought to unify the mexican and latino community with a advertisement that read "Protect Azteca Theater, because with it you are protecting mexican cinematographic industry and that way you help your paisanos and your country."

=== Decline ===
As the 1950s started, a new era for the mexican colonia also arrived as the latino community started moving to the northern suburbs of Linndale and Denver Harbor. People followed the wave of boundary expansion and mexican american businesses started losing customers. The theater started losing its audience by mid-1950. The mexican district in Congress Avenue ceased to exist. The Azteca Theater closed its doors in 1957. Years later, the theater was demolished and converted in a parking lot.

=== Shows ===
Azteca Theater presented both plays and movies in Spanish. It brought the most famous shows in the mexican press to Houston. They from comedy to drama, featuring stars like María Félix, Pedro Armendáriz, Angelica Mendez and comedians like Cantinflas and Tin Tan. Many theatrical companies traveled from Mexico to play at the theater.

The Azteca Theater debuted performers to the public, such as Cuadro Mexico Tipico which was advertised in La Gaceta Mexicana. Another popular performer featured in the theater were Los Hermanos Areu. Among the plays showcased were Sor Teresa de Jesus a drama, The Count of Monte Cristo directed by the actor Manuel Cortera, Les Misérables written by Victor Hugo. Some of the musical presentations included the famous duo Ponce y Prado. Azteca Theater also offered dance presentations like Copania Nacional Cubana directed by Rafael de Arango and Cuadro Mexico Tipico.
