= Geology of the Western Carpathians =

Significant mountain range

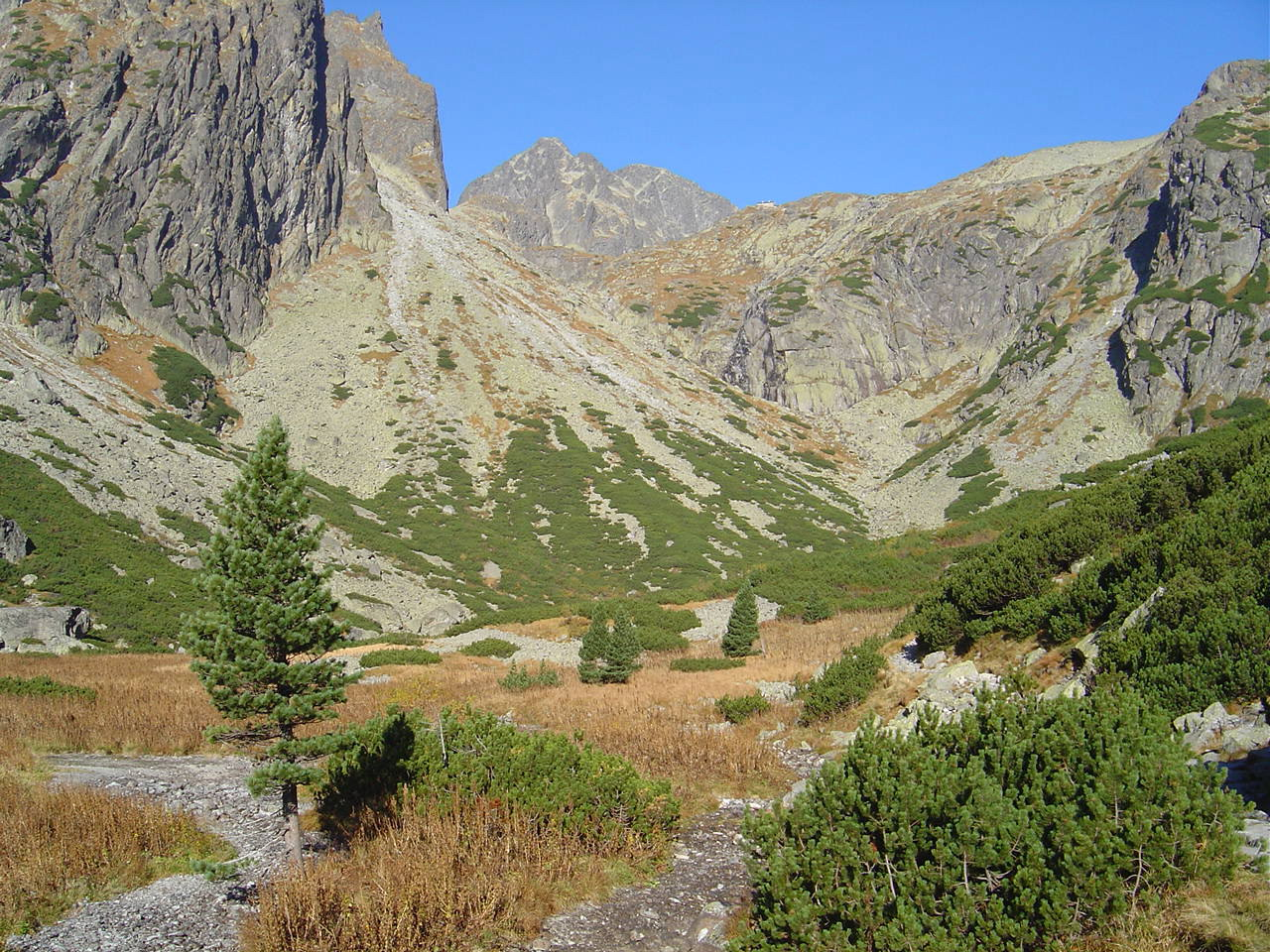
Malá Studená Valley in the Tatras

The Western Carpathians are an arc-shaped mountain range, the northern branch of the Alpine-Himalayan fold and thrust system called the Alpide belt, which evolved during the Alpine orogeny. In particular, their pre-Cenozoic evolution is very similar to that of the Eastern Alps, and they constitute a transition between the Eastern Alps and the Eastern Carpathians.

The geological evolution of individual parts of the chain is complex, a result of tectonic processes like folding, thrusting and the formation of sedimentary basins of various types during the Mesozoic and Cenozoic. These processes sometimes affected not only the sedimentary fill of the basins, but also, in some cases, the former basement.

Many aspects of the geological structure of the Western Carpathians have not been completely studied and are subject to ongoing research and debate. The appropriate classification of a number of specific tectonic units is still not clear.

== Geological definition ==
Geological position of the Western Carpathians in the Alpide belt.

The Western Carpathians are separated from the Alps by the valley of the river Danube (only from the geographical point of view; the geological boundary is the so-called Carnuntum gate) and the Raaba line. To the east, the boundary with the Eastern Carpathians is placed formally in the valley of the river Uzh, but many tectonic divisions consider the Hornád fault system on the line Košice – Prešov the real geological boundary. The northern boundary is the thrust front that separates the nappes from the Carpathian Foredeep. In the Czech Republic the line Znojmo-Přerov-Karviná approximately forms the western boundary of the Western Carpathians. The southern boundary is not distinct (because of the interfingering boundary between the Carpathians and lowlands of the Pannonian Basin). According to some views it is south of the Bükk and Mátra mountains in Hungary.

== Geological structure ==
There are several interpretations of the tectonic structure of the Western Carpathians. For quite a long time, the triple division has been used (Outer, Central and Inner Western Carpathians), while some geologists prefer the classical double division (Outer and Inner Carpathians). Other ideas of division may differ, such as morphotectonic (based on geology and geomorphology) or regional geology. Tectonic division applied in this article is based on the division of Plašienka and others in 1997, later modified in 1999 and in 2002 together with Kováč, although it cannot be considered definitive.

The three main areas of the Inner, Central, and Outer Western Carpathians are divided by two sutures. The Meliata suture is an area of closure of the Triassic-Jurassic Meliata Ocean during the Kimmerian phase. It constitutes the boundary between the Central and Inner Western Carpathians. The position of the boundary is disputable; different authors place the Meliata suture in different areas. It is identified with the Rožňava line, Lubeník-Margecany Line, or possibly placed even more to the South. The second important suture is called the Peri-Pieninic lineament, roughly copying the structure of Pieniny Klippen Belt. This important dislocation divides the Central and Outer Western Carpathians. Deeper under the sediments it constitutes the boundary between the Central Carpathian basement rocks and the foreland – the Bohemian Massif and East European craton (Podolia platform). Since the 1980s the dividing line has been considered the suture of the Vahic Ocean – the Eastern continuation of the Piemont-Liguria Ocean.

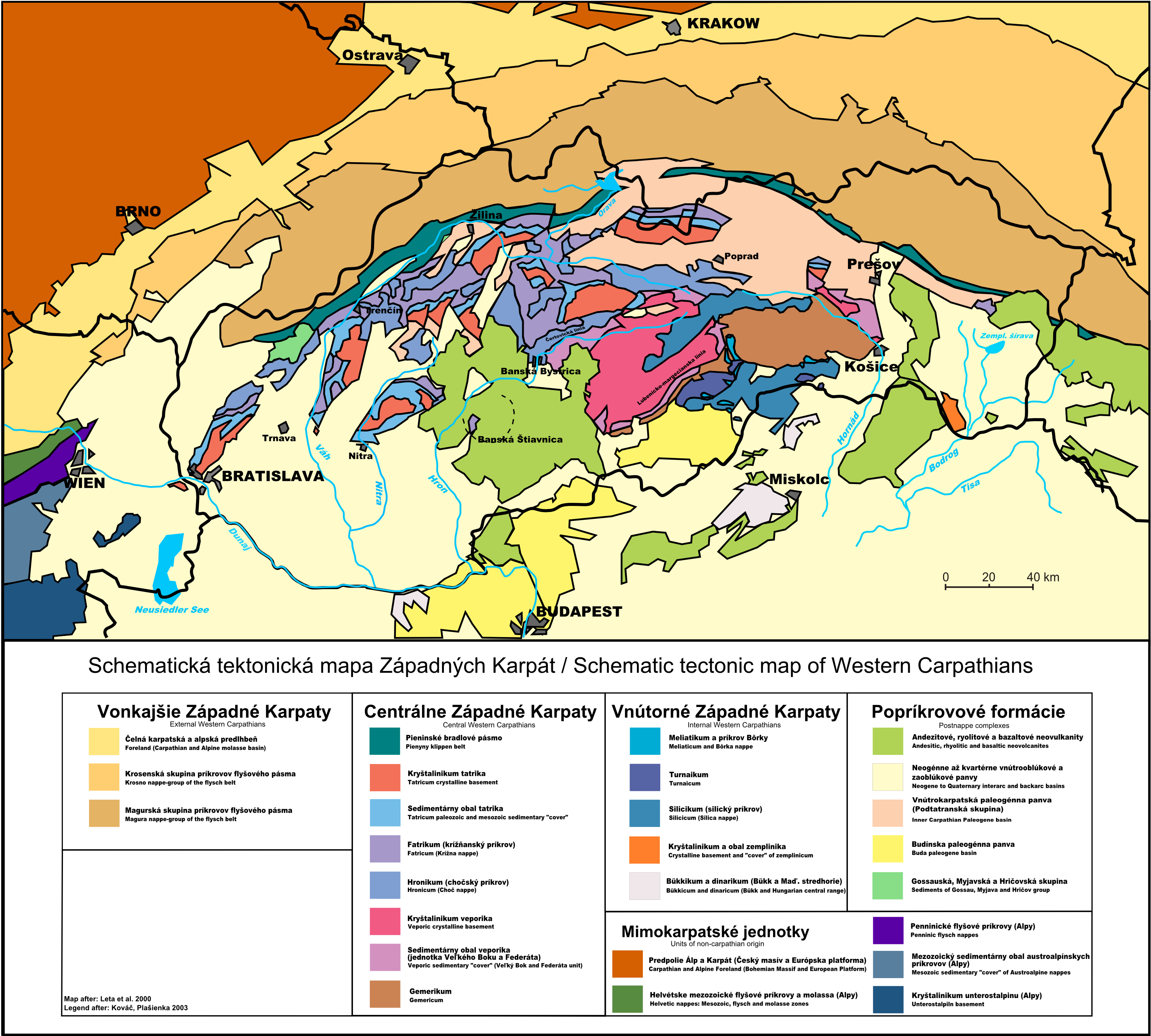
Tectonic map of the Western Carpathians

=== Foreland ===
The foreland of the Western Carpathians in the West and North is composed of the Bohemian Massif and Cracow Plateau. In the Northeast it is formed by the rock of the East European craton. These areas were consolidated earlier than the Carpathians. The Bohemian Massif, which is the youngest part of the foreland, evolved during the Hercynian orogeny about 200 million years before the orogeny in the Carpathians.

=== Outer Western Carpathians ===
The Outer Western Carpathians were formed during orogeny that took part since the Upper Cretaceous (Senonian) and Miocene periods, which is later than the Central Western Carpathians. Pieniny Klippen Belt was affected by thrusting together with the Central Carpathians and later folded and thrust again together with the Flysch Belt.

==== Foredeep ====
Thrust of the Carpathians on their foreland caused a flexure of the lower continental plate under the frontal part of the nappes. This area, called the Carpathian Foredeep, was filled by thick formations of molasse, prevailingly marls, sandstones and conglomerates that were formed in the Oligocene to Miocene periods by erosion of the growing Carpathians. Nevertheless, the foredeep is not generally folded; flysch nappes thrust from the south partially folded the rock underneath. The whole zone of the foredeep is developed in the foreland of the Alps, and runs through the Moravia to the Ostrava Basin and further East to Poland, Ukraine, and Romania.

==== Flysch Belt ====
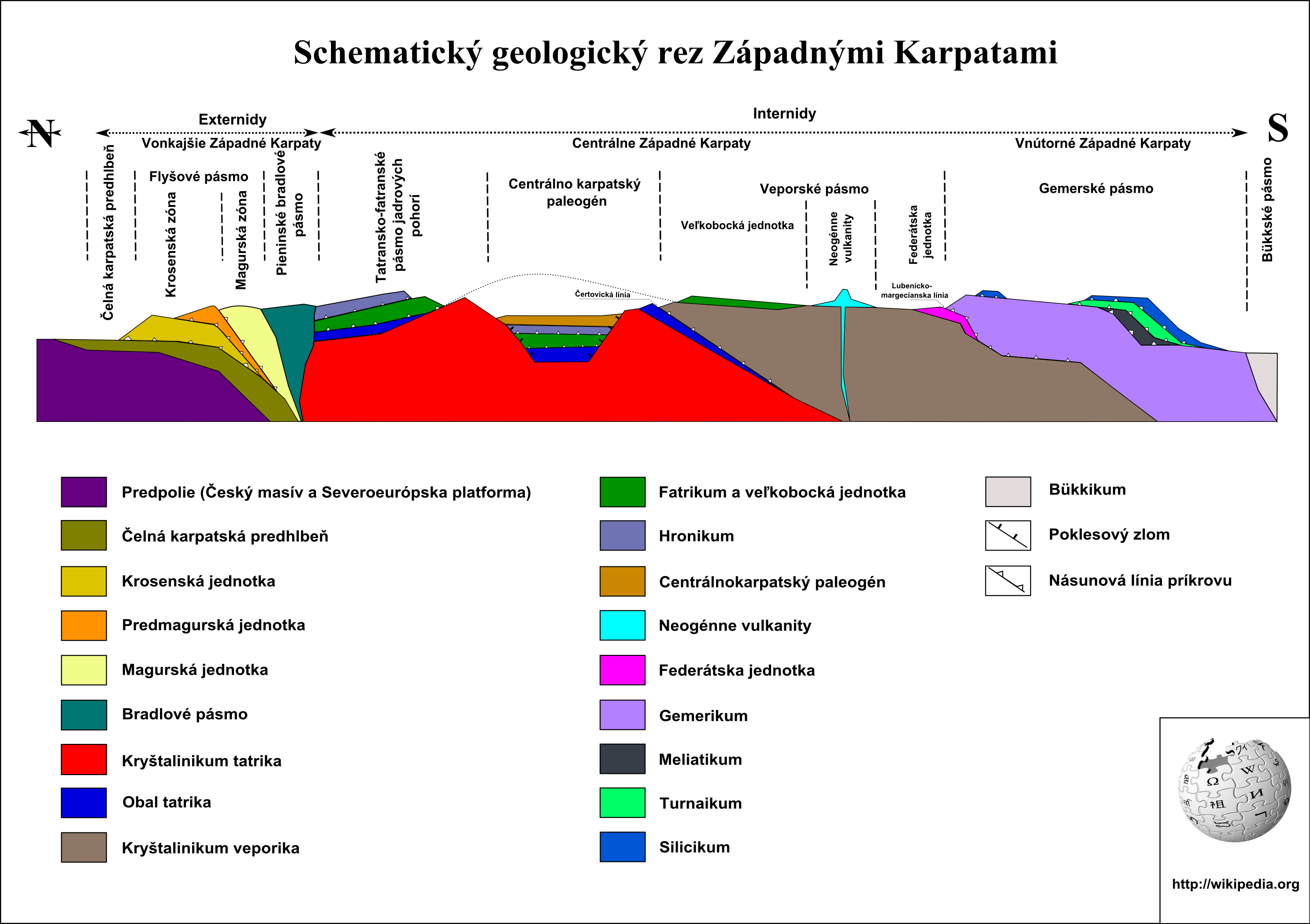
Crossection through the Western Carpathians

The Flysch Belt was named after a characteristic alteration of sandstone and claystone, so called flysch, occurring in the Cretaceous to Paleogene (possibly Miocene) age in the area. The belt is the accretionary wedge of the Carpathians. The Flysch Belt also contains a small volume of Cenozoic volcanic rocks. The zone originally consisted of a set of more sedimentary basins that were in constant tectonic transformation. Raised parts of the basins formed elevations, which were eroded and supplied deeper parts of the basin with clastic sediments that were brought by turbidity currents. Orogeny affected the area at the end of the Paleogene and in the beginning of the Neogene in the so-called Savian phase. Other portions were also affected by the Styrian phase, which caused partial thrusting over the Foredeep. Nappes were formed by gradual compression of the sedimentary basins that caused their inversion and separation of sedimentary successions from their basement and their movement for distance of 20 – 30 km, and possibly more. Nappes were formed in two phases: the outer (Northern) or lower group of nappes called the Silezia-Krosno Belt, and the overriding internal (Southern) Magura Belt. Nappes are thrust over their foreland in the form of tectonic slices. At least part of the Flysch Belt was an Eastern continuation of the Alpine Penninic Zone, probably the Valais branch. A direct continuation of the Alpine Rhine-Danube Flysch can be seen. The Flysch Belt continues through Bohemia, Slovakia, and Poland, and joins the Moldavian Flysch in Ukraine and Romania.

=== Central Western Carpathians ===
The Central Western Carpathians, sometimes referred as the Slovakocarpathian system, are a zone bounded by the Pieniny Klippen Belt from the North and the Meliata Belt from the South. The Pieniny Klippen Belt is a relatively thin but important dividing line separating the Outer Western Carpathians from the internal zones of orogeny. Together with the similar units of the Peri-Klippen zone it constitutes the Považie-Pieniny Belt. The largest portion of the Western Carpathians consists of the zone built of granitic and metamorphic rock (that metamorphic grade is generally higher in the North and lower in the South), and sedimentary cover overridden by thrust nappes of Mesozoic carbonate rocks. The zone consists of the Tatra-Fatra Belt of core mountains, the Vepor Belt, and the Gemer Belt. In their predominantly crystalline basement zones called the Tatric, Veporic, and Gemeric, thrusting (thick-skinned) is also present, but not as apparent. Geophysical investigation confirmed that the Gemeric is thrust over the Veporic, and the Veporic over the Tatric. The Central Western Carpathians formerly constituted a portion of the East European craton continental shelf, and were situated more to the West, in the area of the present Switzerland, laterally joining the Outer Carpathians (represented by the Oravic). During the release of tension within the Alpine collision tectonic events, the stress was released to the flanks of the thrust belt, which caused the tectonic escape of the material. Central Western Carpathians were consequently pushed in the Northeast direction from the Alpine to Carpathian domain.

==== Považie-Pieniny Belt ====
The Považie-Pieniny Belt has a complicated imbricated structure, represented especially by the Pieniny Klippen Belt. It consists of Oravic, Gossau Group, and Magura units, as well as Inner-Carpathian units (e.g. Manín and Drietoma unit etc.). Placement of the Pieniny Klippen Belt into the Central Western Carpathians is ambiguous, because most authors consider Pieniny Klippen Belt as part of the Outer Carpathians. The Považie-Pieniny Belt is divided into three zones: the Brezová, Peri-Klippen, and Klippen zones.

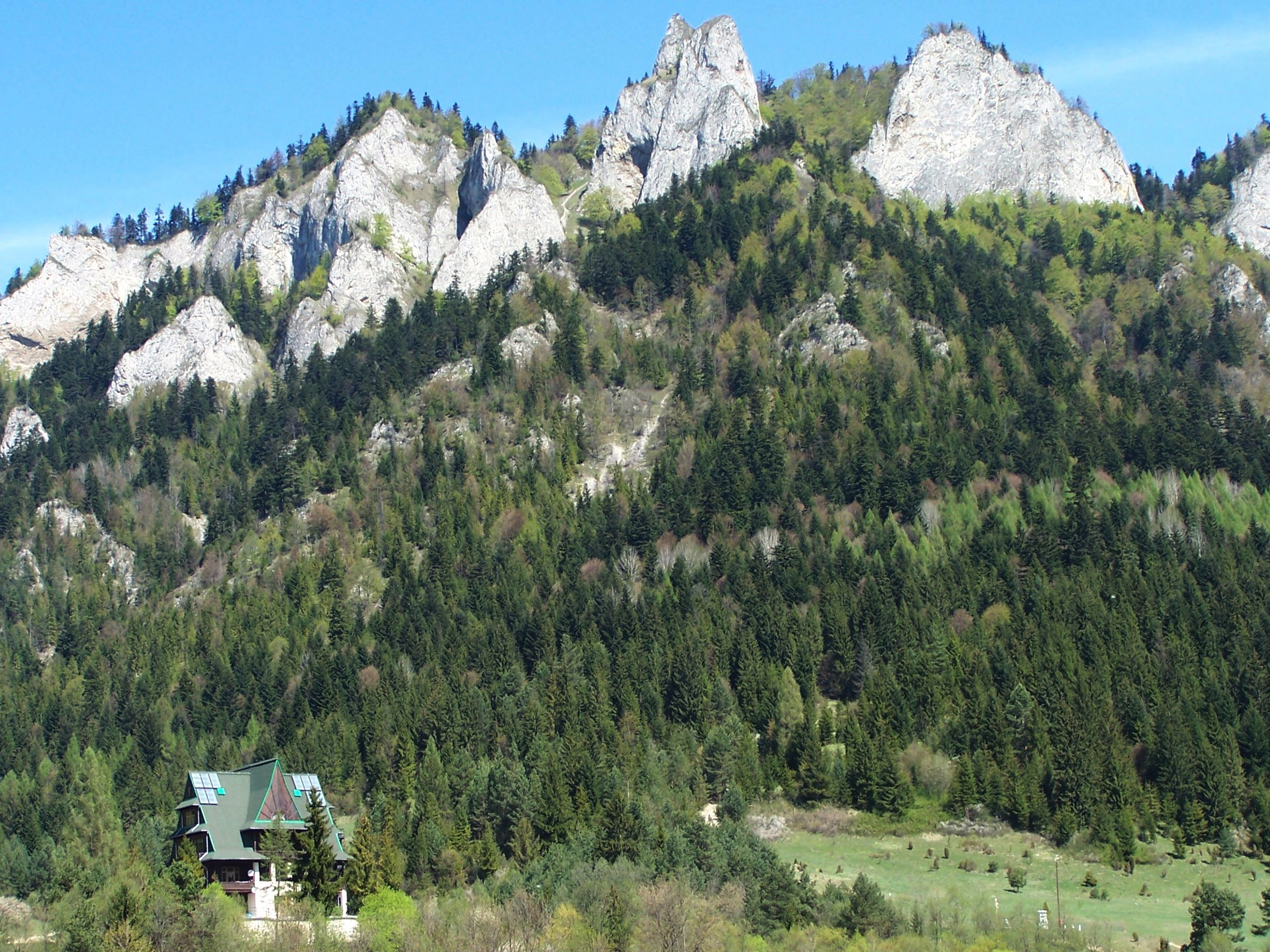
Trzy Korony, one of the largest klippes of the Kysuca-Pieniny unit, Poland.

Relatively thin and complicated, the Pieniny Klippen Belt creates a boundary, a tectonic suture, between the Outer and Central Western Carpathians. Only rock younger than the Triassic is known in this zone. Exclusively nonmetamorphic sedimentary successions are composed especially of limestones and marls. In the Jurassic period, the ocean that opened in the area of the Pieniny Klippen Belt is called the Vahic Ocean (or the South Penninic). Its preserved sedimentary successions are in the present erosion cut known only from the Vahic unit. The Vahic domain was bounded from the North by the slopes of the Oravic, and from the South by the Tatric unit. The subsiding part of the Oravic unit formed the Kysuca Basin. The most shallow part of the Oravic unit was characterized by deposition of shallow water limestones of Czorsztyn unit. To the South, closer to the deep water Kysuca Basin, other transitional units were deposited. In the deepest part of the Kysuca Basin, sediments of Kysuca-Pieniny unit were deposited. The Vahic domain had extended and deepened during its history. In the Upper Cretaceous to Paleocene, the thrusting of the southern units of Tatric caused inversion or subduction of the Vahic Ocean that was followed by collision of the Oravic and Tatric units. As a result of these processes, deformation and North vergent thrusting of the Oravic units in the form of nappes occurred. After the end of compression, marly and flysch-like sedimentation (so-called klippe envelope sediments) continued on the top of the nappe stack. Later in the Paleogene, another phase of orogeny affected the Pieniny Klippen Belt. It squeezed the former nappe stack and the rocks of different rheology (competent limestones, soft flysch, and marls) were deformed in different ways, which caused the rupture of more dense rock and ductile deformation of the less dense rock. Complicated arrangement of particular tectonic units was later affected by strike-slip motion in the area of the Peri-Pieniny Lineament in the Miocene. Consequent erosion dissected the rigid limestone tectonic lenses to the shape of protruding klippes (e.g. Vršatské bradlá in Western Slovakia). The zone of klippes stretches almost uninterrupted from the Podbranč in Western Slovakia to the Poiana Botizei in Northeastern Romanian.

==== Tatra-Fatra Belt of core mountains ====
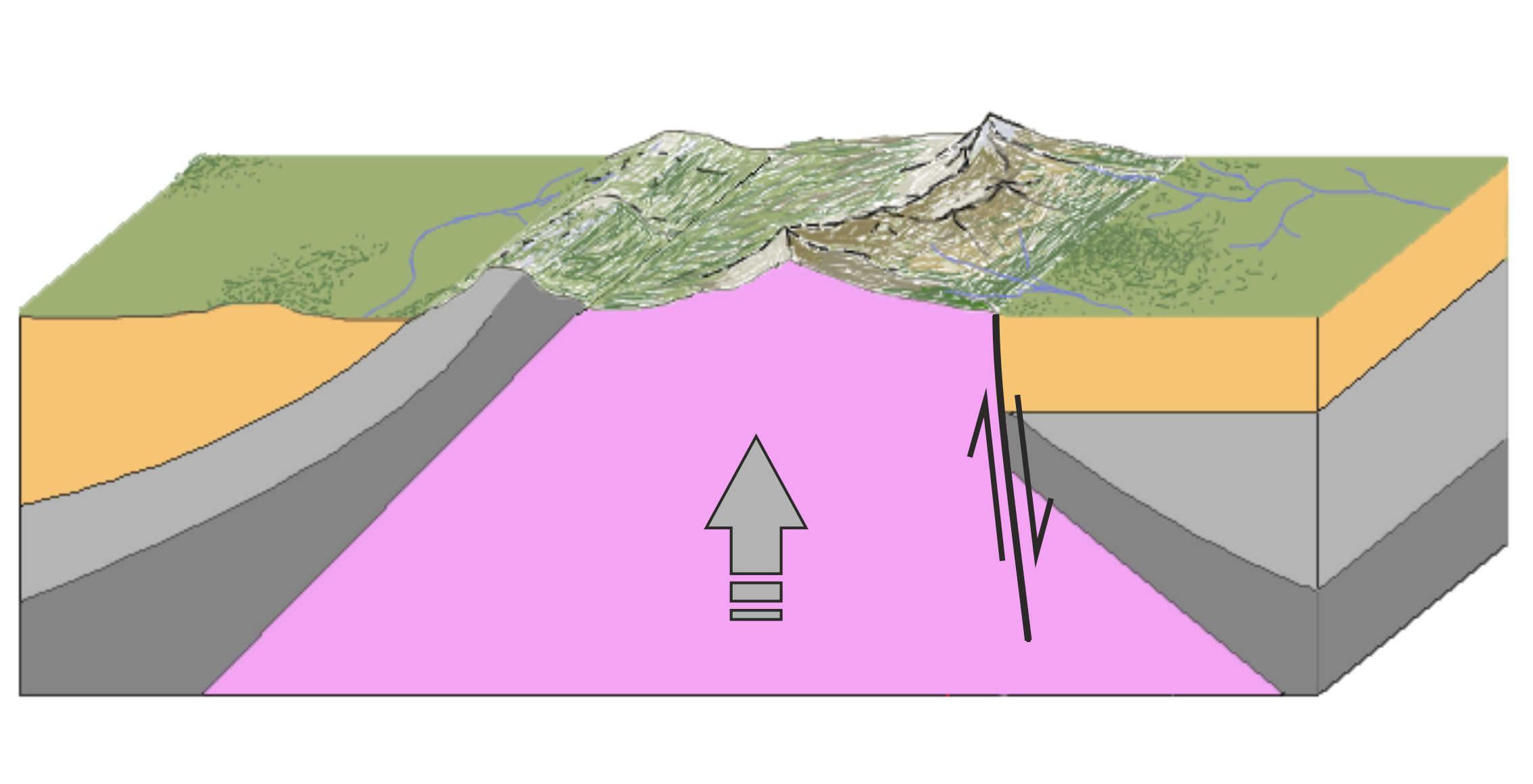
Simplified cross-section through the Core mountain: Cenozoic cover Mesozoic nappes Autochthonous sedimentary cover Crystalline basement

South of the Pieniny Klippen Belt, the zone of core mountains is present. The core is formed by the Tatric unit composed predominantly by Paleozoic metamorphic rock, younger plutonic rock, and Carboniferous to Mesozoic sedimentary cover. Basement rock was formed during the Hercynian orogeny when a strong regional metamorphism affected the area. Paragneisses and amphibolites are most abundant, but low grade metamorphic rock is also present. Later, at the end of Hercynian orogeny in the Carboniferous and Permian, the area was intruded by granitic rock and strongly affected by erosion, which affected even the deeply situated granites. The autochthonous Carboniferous, Permian and most commonly Mesozoic sediments are onlapping the crystalline basement. They are represented by greywackes, quartz sandstones, shales, limestones, and marls. Sedimentary cover of the Tatric unit is overridden by Mesozoic nappes. Nappes are large slabs of the Mesozoic carbonate rock with similar sedimentary sequence as present in the Tatric cover. There are two so-called Subtatric nappes: the lower called the Kížna nappe (or the Fatric) and the upper called Choč nappe (or the Hronic). The Fatric is characterised by the occurrence of thicker formations of the Carpathian Keuper. The Hronic is typical with the occurrence of Permian andesitic-basalts (so called Ipoltica Group) and a larger thickness of variable Triassic carbonate rock. Thrusting of the nappes took place in the Upper Cretaceous, probably during the Turonian. The whole area was not so rangy as it is today. Uplift of the mountains took place at the end of the Oligocene and in the Miocene. It caused the uplift of the horsts, usually asymmetric, on the South flank, steeply bounded by normal faults and slightly declining to the North flank. The crystalline basement is usually uncovered on the South flank of the horsts. The horsts form two rows of mountains. The northern (outer) row consists of the Malé Karpaty Mts. (Pezinok part and Hainburg Mts.), Považský Inovec Mts., Strážovské vrchy Mts., Malá Fatra Mts., and Tatra Mts. The Southern row of core mountains includes the Tríbeč Mts., Žiar Mts., Veľká Fatra Mts., Chočské vrchy Mts., The Eastern part of Nízke Tatry Mts. (so called Ďumbierske Tatry) and Branisko Mts.

==== Vepor Belt ====
The Vepor Belt is a zone South of the belt of core mountains. The dividing line is called the Čertovica line. A characteristic feature of the Vepor belt is medium Alpine regional metamorphism. The largest area of this zone is formed by the Veporic unit. Crystalline basement rock is most abundant in this area, and the largest granitic pluton in the Western Carpathians is present here. It was formed during the Hercynian orogeny. Mesozoic sedimentary cover is preserved only locally. The Veporic unit was the root area of the Krížna nappe (Fatric) that was formerly situated in the inverted Zliechov Basin on the northern rim of the Veporic, close to the Tatric. Inversion of the basin took place in the Upper Cretaceous and was accompanied by intrusion of a small body of granite. In addition to nappe outliers of the Choč nappe (Hronic) and part of the Krížna nappe (Fatric), there is also a large body of Muráň nappe (Silicic unit). The Veporic is partially thrust over the Tatric and lies under the Gemeric unit. The nappe stack of the Veporic and Gemeric later collapsed and evolved in the Veporic metamorphic core complex. The Vepor Belt forms the Eastern part of the Nízke Tatry Mts. (Kráľovohoľské Tatry), Vepor Mts., Kozie chrbty Mts., southern portion of the Branisko Mts. and Čierna hora Mts. On the South it is divided from the Slovak Ore Mountains by the Lubeník-Margecany Line that is a gently dipping thrust fault.

==== Gemer Belt ====
The Gemer Belt is a zone of predominantly crystalline rock, partially thrust over the Veporic. The most important portion of the zone is the Gemeric unit, unlike the other Carpathian units with signs of low grade (greenschist facies) Hercynian metamorphic overprint. The Gemeric is the uppermost basement-involved unit of the Central Western Carpathians. It is made by phyllites, quartzites, porphyries and limestones commonly metamorphosed to siderite and magnesite. Granites are less abundant. Permian volcanic activity formed the uraninite mineralization. Later, during the Mesozoic, limestones and dolomite were deposited. In the Upper Jurassic, after the closure of the Meliata Ocean, nappes of the Meliatic and Tornaic were thrust from the South. In the Upper Cretaceous, Silicic nappe was thrust over the previous. At the end of Paleogene, the Gemeric Belt was deformed and uplifted. This zone forms the Slovak Ore Mountains, Galmus, and Slovak Karst.

=== Internal Western Carpathians ===
The Internal Western Carpathians are divided from the Central Western Carpathians by the Rožňava line, which is partly covered by the décollement nappes. The Rožňava line is largely a conceptual one and is perceived differently by different authors. According to assumptions, the fault joins the Raaba-Hurbanovo line on the West. Other problem of exact definition of boundary between the Internal and Central Western Carpathians are views of the structure of the Meliatic unit. The Internal Western Carpathians are composed generally of the tectonic units originating from the area of the former Meliata-Halstatt Ocean or South of it. This zone is built of the Meliata, Bükk, Transdanubian, and Zemplín Belt. There are large nappes of Mesozoic carbonates (Silicic, Meliatic, Tornaic), which are not affected by metamorphism and are characteristic with typical affinity to the South Alps-Dinaride facies.

==== Meliata Belt ====
The Meliata Belt is a remnant of the Triassic-Jurassic Meliata ocean (or back-arc basin). The principal structural unit of the belt is Meliatic, composed of rocks of the subduction mélange – deep water shales, radiolarites, basalts of oceanic type and marbles. The unit of the uncertain arrangement, which is according to some authors part of the Meliatic, is the Bôrka Nappe, composed of the obducted blueschists. The Silicic and Tornaic unit probably originate from the Southern continental shelf of the Meliata Ocean. The Silicic is the nappe characteristic with larger thickness of shallow water limestones of Wetterstein facies. The Tornaic nappe was probably a transitional area between the Silicic and Meliatic. Nappes in the Meliata Belt were thrust to the North and now consist mostly of outliers lying on the Gemeric and Veporic units, constituting the Slovak Karst and Aggtelek Karst on the Slovak-Hungarian border.

==== Bükk Belt ====
To the south of the previous area there is the Bükkic unit, which bears the signs of the transitional zone between the Western Carpathians and the Dinarides. Rock of the Bükkic occurs in the north Hungarian mountain Bükk. It consists generally of the Paleozoic shales, carbonates, and sandstones, but also overlying younger Mesozoic carbonates and volcanic rocks. Sedimentation continued to the Jurassic when the nappes of unclear vergence were thrust. The zone was later in the Cretaceous affected by low grade metamorphism. During the subduction of the Meliata-Halstatt Ocean in the Upper Jurassic, the back-arc basin evolved. This basin was later inverted and it was probably the root zone of the Mónosbél-Szarvaskő nappe.

==== Transdanubian Belt ====
The Transdanubian or the Bakony Belt principal tectonic unit called the Transdanubicum occurs in the Transdanubian Mountains (Bakony, Gerecse, Vértes, and Buda Mountains). It consists of the low grade metamorphic Paleozoic and Mesozoic rock and Cenozoic sedimentary cover.

==== Zemplín Belt ====
A tectonic unit of uncertain position is the Zemplinic in the horst of the Zemplín Mts., emerging from the Cenozoic sedimentary fill of the Eastern Slovakia Basin. The Zemplinic is according to some authors either assigned to the separate belts (Zemplín Belt or Sub-Vihorlat Belt) or considered as a part of the separate terrane Tisia-Dacia. Some geologists assign it to the Southern Veporic, the Gemeric unit, or even to the Eastern Carpathians. The Zemplinic is the only place of occurrence of the Precambrian rock in the Western Carpathians. They are composed of the paragneisses, amphibolites, and migmatites, together with Post-Hercynian Carboniferous and Permian conglomerates and thin beds of black coal.

=== Post-nappe units ===
The Jurassic-Cretaceous tectonic structure was later changed by various types of the overstep complexes: the Central Carpathian Paleogene Basin, Buda Paleogene Basin, Vienna Basin (Neogene, pull-apart type), Pannonian Basin (or the Danube Basin), and the volcanic complexes: Neogene volcanics of Carpathians (or just Neovolcanis).

== Volcanism ==
=== Paleozoic and Mesozoic volcanism ===
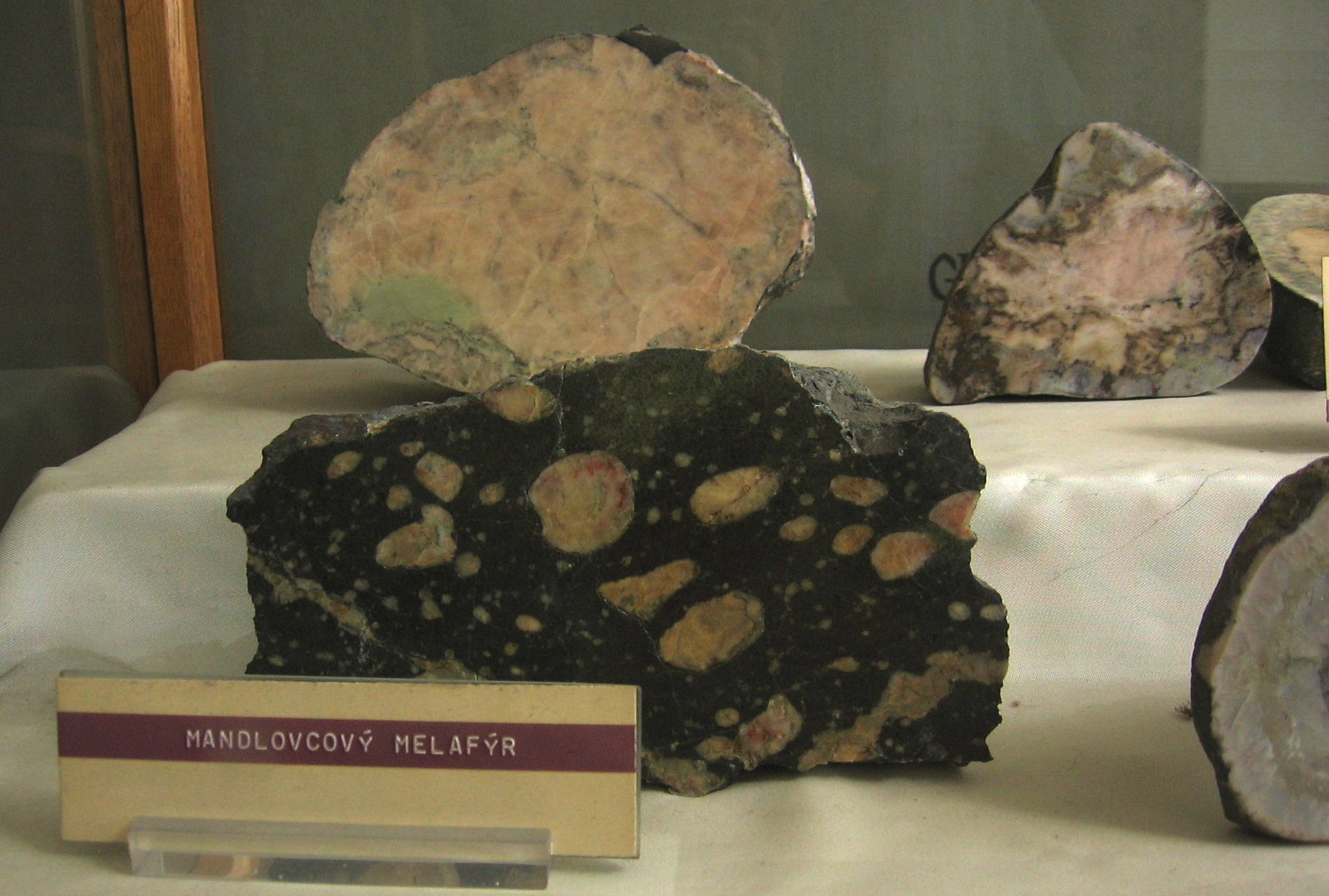
Permian andesitic-basalt with agate, so called melaphyry.

The oldest forms of volcanism, which affected the area of the Western Carpathians, are hardly recognized because of later tectonic processes and destruction by erosion.

Significant volcanic activity took place in the Lower Paleozoic in the Malé Karpaty Mts., where the relicts are seen in the rock of the Pernek Group with typical basic volcanism. Large volumes of volcanic rock, considered a product of stratovolcanos, significantly changed by metamorphism, are present in the Gemeric. Basic volcanism is recognized in the Carboniferous and Permian rock. Among the Permian rock the Ipoltica Group of the Hronic nappe is best known. The lower part of the group is called the Malužiná Formation. It is characteristic of synsedimentary dacite to andesite volcanism in the lower part and andesitic-basalts close to the Tholeitic type in the upper part. Nodules of hydrothermal agate are common in the cavities of these rocks, widely known as the melaphyres. According to some authors, Permian volcanism in Hronic has polyphase linear character.

Mesozoic volcanic processes are more distinct and known from all zones of the Western Carpathians. There are Triassic effusives in the rock of Fatric and Hronic of the Malá Fatra Mts. and Nízke Tatry Mts. Picrites are known around Banská Bystrica. Cretaceous těšínites (subvolcanic alkalic gabbro) were found in the Slesian zone of the Flysch Belt. Remnants of destructed ophiolites with N-MORB basalts in the upper part are present in the rock of the Meliatic.

=== Cenozoic volcanism ===
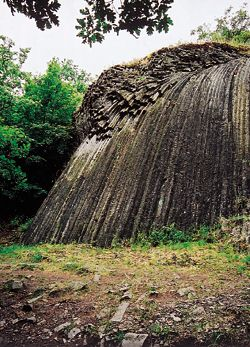
"Basalt waterfall" at Šomoška castle, Cerová vrchovina. Typical basaltic parting.

Post nappe volcanic activity in the Carpathians is simply called neovolcanism. It took place from the Neogene (Lower Badenian) to the Quaternary, mostly in the internal portion of the Carpathian arc (on a smaller scale also in the external Carpathians). Three main phases of the volcanic activity are distinguished:

- Acid volcanism – began in the lower Miocene in northern Hungary and later extended into the territory of present Slovakia. It is represented by rhyodacite to rhyolitic rock. This type of volcanism is called the areal type, because of its large areal extent. In central Slovakia, volcanic rock formed the Poľana, Kremnica, and Vtáčnik Mts. Rhyodacite tuffs in sediments of Lower Badenian are known in the Zemplín region of Eastern Slovakia.
- Intermediate volcanism – started in the Lower Badenian, and from a petrological point of view it represents calc-alcaline andesites to dacites, related to subduction of the ocean floor in the Flysch Belt and related formation of the volcanic arc. Volcanism started in a sub-aquatic environment near the Šahy-Lysec zone of the Krupina Plain. Later a massive stratovolcano of the Poľana, Javorie, Lysec, Čelovce, and particularly the Štiavnica stratovolcano and volcano in the Kremnica Mountains. After a period of strong erosion, the volcanic activity restored in Upper Badenian. Restored volcanism was more explosive. In the Slovak Ore Mountains (in the area of Tisovec and Rimava Basin) significantly eroded remnants of former stratovolcanoes comparable to the Central Slovakia ones were found. In the lower Sarmatian, a subduction process in the present Eastern Slovakia resulted in the formation of a line of geomorphologically simple stratovolcanoes of the Slanské vrchy Mts. Volcanoes of this phase are found also in Romania. The younger phase of volcanism is known in the area of Vihorlat Mts.
- Basic volcanism – represented by alcaline rock, is found in Central and Southern Slovakia and Hungary. The prevailing rock type is basalt with phenocrysts of olivine or nepheline (basalts in the area of Banská Štiavnica). There were lava flows in the vicinity of the Ostrá Lúka near Zvolen and Devičie near Krupina, lava flows and maars in the vicinity of Pinciná, Jelšovec, lava flows, necks, dikes, and maars in Cerová vrchovina, and the youngest cinder cone, the Putikov vŕšok, near the Nová Baňa.

== Metamorphism ==
The occurrence of metamorphosed crystalline rock in the Western Carpathians is known from the Tatric, Veporic, Gemeric, and Zemplinic zones. Existing research has clearly demonstrated traces of the Hercynian and Alpine orogeny. Although some authors suggest the possible presence of the older Cadomian or Caledonian metamorphic cycles, existence of the Precambrian metamorphic cycles was not confirmed because of the later metamorphic overprint.

Caledonian metamorphism has not been clearly proved, but some signs are present in amphibolites of the Malé Karpaty Mts. (about 395 million years old) or the granite of Sihla type in the Veporic (about 370–380 million years old). More common is the Hercynian metamorphism, which is associated with regional and periplutonic metamorphism caused by intrusions of granitic rock, diapthoresis and low grade metamorphism of volcanosedimentary formations of several tectonic units to the greenschist facies. Signs of the Alpine metamorphism, which took place 75–107 million years ago, are well preserved in the Mesozoic formations of the Tatric, Gemeric, and especially Veporic. Special subduction related metamorphism to blueschist facies is known from the Bôrka nappe.

== Earthquakes ==
The Western Carpathians are from the neotectonic point of view part of the ALCAPA block. Main earthquakes in the ALCAPA were located in the subduction arc of the Hellenides and Calabrids. Deep focus earthquakes are known only from the zone of Vrancea, where the subduction is still active. No deep focused earthquakes related to subduction were recorded in the Western Carpathians. A period of significant continental collision and shortening of the crust affected the area in the Miocene. Later, primarily extensional and strike-slip movement in the Neogene generated new or reactivated older faults. There are five principal earthquake zones located in the area of the Western Carpathians: the Pezinok-Pernek zone, which is a continuation of the faults responsible for formation of the Vienna Basin, the Dobrá Voda zone with the most intensive and most shallow earthquakes around the Dobrá Voda fault, the Komáro zone of earthquakes, which joins the Rába-Hurbanovo-Darnó fault (also known as Raaba linie), separating the Pelso unit from the Inner Carpathian crystalline basement, the Žilina zone of earthquakes, related to the ongoing collision and strike-slip movement in the Pieniny Klippen Belt, and the Central Slovakia zone, which is probably the result of tectonic activity of the Central Slovak fault.

== Quaternary deposits ==
The Quaternary glaciations identified in the Western Carpathians are, from oldest to youngest: Donau, Günz, Mindel, Riss and Würm. During these glaciations glaciers extender downhill from the High Tatras and nonglaciated uplands were subject to frost weathering and solifluction. Deflation of soils is also evident in mountainous locations. Glaciofluvial cones formed in the forelands of the Western Carpathians in connection to the last glaciation. Four systems of terminal and lateral moraines formed during the last glaciation and its immediate aftermath have been recognised in the Slovak Carpathians.
