= Geology of Slovakia =

Geological map of Slovakia

The geology of Slovakia is structurally complex, with a highly varied array of mountain ranges and belts largely formed during the Alpine orogeny in the Mesozoic and Cenozoic eras and with relicts of older Variscan structures of Paleozoic age. The internal zones of the West Carpathian orogen collapsed during the Paleogene forming the Central Carpathian Paleogne Basin. Later, in the Miocene, the Pannonian Basin and Carpathian volcanic chain were formed.

== Stratigraphy, tectonics and geologic history ==
Most of Slovakia is situated within the West Carpathian orogenic belt, except for the east of the country which is in the East Carpathians. However, the geological boundary does not coincide with the geographical one. A large area in the southern part of Slovakia is covered with Miocene sediments of the Pannonian Basin system. The West Carpathians are Mesozoic to Cenozoic in age. The internal zones were formed on the collapsed Variscan crust during Late Paleozoic and Mesozoic extension.

=== Outer Western Carpathians ===
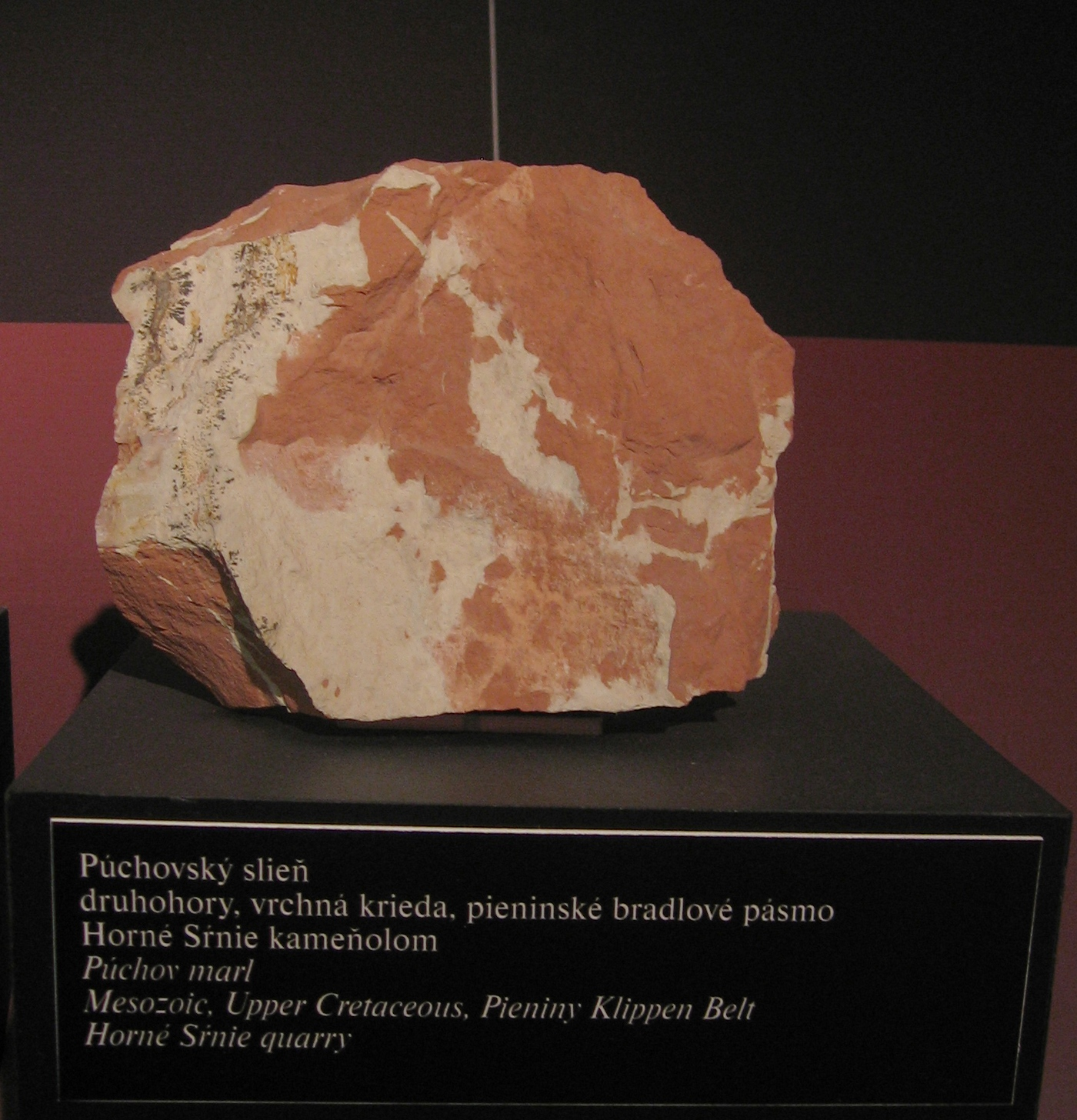
Marl from the Pieniny Klippen Belt at Horné Srnie quarry

The Outer Carpathians form an external thin-skin thrustbelt around the Inner Carpathian crustal scale thick-skinned nappes. The two main units are:

- Carpathian Flysch Belt: Paleogene to Miocene-age nappes, made up of folded Cretaceous and Paleogene sedimentary rocks, mostly deep water turbidites (flysch). These units are interpreted as a Cretaceous-Miocene accretionary wedge. The nappes were thrust northward over the foredeep and the edge of East European platform.
- Pieniny Klippen Belt: A narrow 10-15 kilometer wide highly compressed zone with relatively rigid Jurassic-Lower Cretaceous limestone "klippen" surrounded by more plastic Cretaceous marlstones and sandstones. Contains rocks of Early Jurassic to Late Cretaceous, locally also Paleogene age. Contains also bodies of Albian to Late Cretaceous exotic conglomerates.

=== Internal Western Carpathians ===
- Gemericum: the structurally highest thick-skinned crustal scale unit composed of Cambrian or Ordovician through Triassic age phyllite, metaquartzite, lydite (black chert) and crystalline limestone partly replaced with siderite belonging to the Gelnica and Rakovec Group. Five to 10 kilometers thick in the Spišsko-gemerske rudohorie Mountains. Also contains marine rocks from the Carboniferous and Permian volcanic rocks and Permian granite intrusions. The Gemericum was thrust to the North above the Veporicum unit in mid-Cretaceous. The contact is marked by the Lubeník-Margecany shear zone.
- Veporicum: middle thick-skinned crustal scale unit formed by Variscan granites and medium- to high-grade metamorphic rocks, mostly gneisses, amphibolites and mica-schists. Also contains Late Paleozoic to Mesozoic sedimentary cover, often with varying degrees of Alpine metamorphism. The contact with the underlying Tatricum is marked by the Čertovica shear zone. The Veporicum represents the axial zone of West Carpahtian orogen affected by pervasive Alpine metamorphism and exhumation. The complex of Muráň orthogneiss represents one of the oldest rocks in the West Carpathians.
- Tatricum: lower thick-skinned crustal scale unit with similar composition as Veporicum, containing Variscan granites and gneiss, and Mesozoic sedimentary cover. Overlain by the Fatric and Hronic nappes.
- Meliaticum: Represents Jurassic subduction mélange. Containing Permian gypsum, Triassic limestones and basalts as well as serpentinite as blocks in Jurassic claystones and shales. Represents a suture after closure of the Meliata-Hallstatt ocean. The Melaticum usually occurs in tectonic windows within the Silica Nappe (e.g., at type locality near Meliata village) and often in hangingwall of Gemericum (e.g., near Jaklovce village).
- Bôrka Nappe: A narrow belt between Slovak Karst and Gemericum with glaucophanitized, thus affected by HP/LT metamorphism, basic volcanites and other rocks. Most of the protolith formerly belonged to Gemeric rocks. Usually considered as part of Meliaticum.
- Tornaicum: nappe unit in the footwall of Silicium, affected by low pressure metamorphism, containing Triassic metacarbonates of deep water origin.
- Silicicum or Silica Nappe: thin-skinned nappe, with up to 1.2 kilometer thick Triassic Wetterstein Limestone. The karst plain of the Slovak Karst are formed within the Silica Nappe. It did originally include Jurassic rocks, but these have mostly eroded away. The nappe was emplaced in Late Jurassic or earliest Cretaceous. Represents structurally highest nappe unit of the West Carpathians.
- Hronicum or Choč Nappe: thin-skinned nappe system composed of Carboniferous to Lower Cretaceous rocks, mostly limestones (e.g., Wetterstein and Reifling limestones) and dolomites (Ramsau and Wetterstein), locally also thick shales and sandstones of Lunz Formation. Also includes thick Late Paleozoic volcano-sedimentary Ipoltica Group. Represents structurally highest nappe above the Tatricum, usually overlying Fatricum. Locally overlain by the Upper Cretaceous Gosau type basins (e.g. Brezová Group).
- Fatricum or Krížna Nappe: thin-skinned nappe composed of typical sequence of Triassic to Cretaceous limestones, dolomites, shales (e.g., Carpathian Keuper), marlstones (e.g., Allgäu Formation), radiolarites (Ždiar Formation) and sandstones is thrust over the Tatricum in Albian-Turonian. The sedimentary sequence of Fatricum is similar to Tatric and Veporic sedimentary cover, and its knowledge is suitable from an educational point of view for understanding the development of the Internal Western Carpathians.
- Transdanubicum: Mesozoic nappe unit of Austroalpine affinity occurring in the basement of the Danube Basin south of the Raaba-Hurbanovo-Diosjenő fault zone.
- Zemplinicum: tectonic unit composed of Paleozoic basement and Upper Paleozoic to Mesozoic cover of uncertain tectonic affinity emerging from the basement of the East Slovak Basin in the Zemplín Mountains.

Important nappe stacking of the Internal Western Carpathians occurred gradually since the early Cretaceous. With peak metamorphism in the core of the internal zones of the orogen at approx. 120 - 80 million years ago.

=== Cenozoic (66 million years ago-present) ===
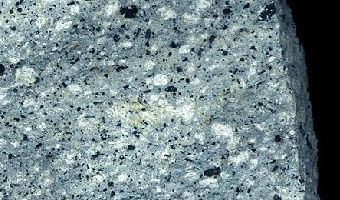
Neogene andesite from Krupina

In the zone surrounding the Pieniny Klippen Belt, sedimentation was not interrupted and continued from the Late Cretaceous to Paleocene in Gosau type basins, forming the Myjava-Hričov Group including the Súľov Paleogene. Conglomerates, marlstones as well as the Kambühel Limestone were deposited in this period.

Another marine transgression flooded the region from the vicinity of the Flysch Belt into the area of the Internal West Carpathians during the middle Eocene represented by the Sub-Tatra (or Podtatranská) Group or the Central Carpathian Paleogene Basin. Paleogene sediments are found in the Orava, Liptov, Spiš, Žilina and Podhale depressions. Conglomerates are common as the bottom of the succession, overlain by flysch (alternating sandstones and claystones). At the edge of the subducting Flysch Belt, sedimentary rocks are up to four kilometers thick. The Central Carpathian Paleogene Basin rocks are usually not folded, however, local backthrusting was documented.

Molasse deposits laid down in the Oligocene span into southern Slovakia from the Pannonian Basin in Hungary. The back-arc molasse formed several large basins, including the Vienna Basin, Danube Basin, South Slovak Basin and East Slovak Basin in the Neogene (the Danube, South Slovak and East Slovak are all subdivisions of the larger Pannonian Basin). The basins are filled with the sediments associated with the Paratethys Ocean, up to five kilometers thick. Shales and marls are particularly common, intercalated with sandstone, tuff, conglomerate and algal limestones. Sediments became brackish over time as the Paratethys was isolated from the rest of the world's oceans since Sarmatian to Panonian. Overall, the basins are split up by numerous faults and small grabens, such as the Trenčín, Ilava, Horná Nitra Basin, Turiec Basin, Žiar Basin and Orava Basin, often filled with lake sediments.

The volcanic activity was important in the Miocene especially in the Central and Eastern Slovakia. Geophysical research and boreholes have shed light also on the buried volcanic rocks in the Danube Basin. The buried centers were at Šurany or Kráľová. The volcanic rocks are found throughout the Central Western Carpathians and eastern Slovakia. The volcanism was related to the subduction of the Flysch Belt and back-arc extension of the Pannonian Basin. The main phase of volcanism occurred in Badenian and Sarmatian. It is represented by andesite, dacite and rhyolite. Intrusion of granodiorite is known in the area of Hodruša and Banská Štiavnica. Youngest late Miocene/Pliocene to Quaternary volcanic activity was represented by alkaline basalts to basanites.

A swarm of andesite dikes is also documented in the Pieniny Klippen Belt, however, the Cenozoic volcanic activity in this region was negligible compared to the Central and Eastern Slovakia volcanic field.

In the Upper Pliocene, prior to the Quaternary glaciations Slovakia had a subtropical climate akin to Mediterranean climate.

==== Quaternary ====
The Quaternary glaciations identified in Slovakia are, from oldest to youngest: Donau, Günz, Mindel, Riss and Würm. During these glaciations glaciers extender downhill from the High Tatras and nonglaciated uplands were subject to frost weathering and solifluction. Deflation of soils is also evident in mountainous locations.

Peat, eolian wind-blown sands, fluvial sand and gravel and loess are all typical Quaternary sediments, formed in the past 2.5 million years old and dominating the surface of Slovak lowlands. The loess sheets of Slovakia are named, from the lowest to the highest W_{1}, W_{2} and W_{3}. In between W_{1} and W_{2} lies a layer of black-earth soil and between W_{2} and W_{3} lies an incipient soil which in parts is gleyed or cryoturbated.

The Váh River has up to seven terraces of sand and gravel. Travertine and tufa is also common, including travertine which preserved a cranial mold of a Neanderthal from Gánovce. Moraine formations remain in the high mountains from the Pleistocene glaciations.

== Economic geology ==
The moderately metamorphosed Spišsko-gemerské rudohorie Mts. formed by Paleozoic rocks of Gemericum hosts veins of siderite, chalcopyrite and tetrahedrite along with the Veitsch-type magnesite (Hnúšťa, Jelšava and Lubeník). Permian rocks often hold uranium ore.

The Kremnica and Štiavnica Mountains formed by the Miocene volcanic rocks have polymetallic lead, zinc, copper, gold and silver veins. Similar, however, less extensive ore veins are found in the Vihorlat and Slanské vrchy Mountains in Eastern Slovakia. The exploited polymetalic Au-Ag-Pb-Zn-Cu mineral deposit of the Rozália Mine is located near Hodruša. Iron skarn related to Miocene volcanism is known in the Muránka planina Plateau.

Salt is found in the Neogene East Slovak Basin and brown coal was extracted from both the Handlová-Nováky Basin and the Modrý Kameň-Potor Basin. There are small deposits of natural gas and oil in the Neogene strata of the Vienna Basin together with older Triassic rocks.
