= Dimitrij Andrusov =

Slovak geologist (1897–1976)

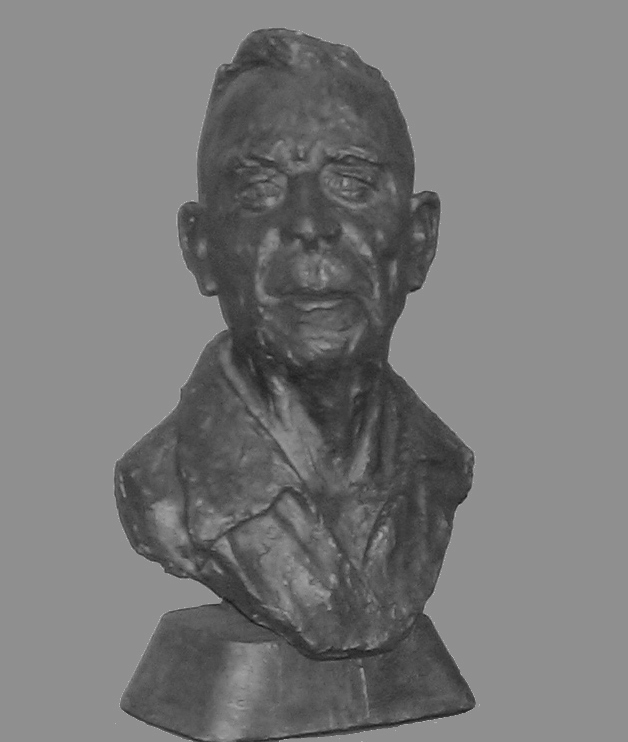
- Born: 7 November 1897; Tartu, Governorate of Livonia, Russian Empire
- Died: 1 April 1976 (age 78); Bratislava, Czechoslovakia
- Education: Czech Technical University
- Known for: tectonic studies in the Western Carpathians
- Awards: Gustav-Steinmann-Medaille (1973)
- Scientific career
- Fields: geologist
- Workplaces: Comenius University; Geological Institute of Dionýz Štúr

Dimitrij Andrusov (7 November 1897 – 1 April 1976) was a Slovak geologist of Russian origin, member of the Slovak Academy of Sciences. He was first professor of geology on Slovak colleges. He is considered the founder of modern Slovak geology.

== Life ==
Dimitrij Andrusov was born on 7 November 1897 in the former Yuryev (today Tartu) then in the Russian Empire (today Estonia). He was a grandson of Heinrich Schliemann and son of geologist Nicolai Ivanovich Andrusov. In 1915-1918 he studied on the university in Saint Petersburg. Later in 1920–1922 on Sorbonne University in France. He continued his studies on the Faculty of Chemical Technology on Czech Technical University in Prague and graduated there in 1925. Since 1929 he worked in the Technical University.

Following the closure of Czech higher education during the German occupation of the country, he has gone to Slovakia, where he worked since 1938 at the Slovak Technical University in Bratislava. Since 1940 he began to work at the same time on the Faculty of Natural Sciences of the Comenius University in the office of head of Geological and Paleontological Institute. He was the first professor of geology working on Slovak colleges. At the same time, with help of Imrich Karvaš, he contributed to the establishment of the Slovak geological survey which he led in the years 1940 to 1945. In 1952 Andrusov became head of Department of Geology at the Faculty of Natural Sciences at the Comenius University and remained in office until 1970. As a teacher, he wrote several textbooks and teaching texts, in addition to teaching students of geology and geological mapping, he personally led courses and field excursions, where he imparted his knowledge in practice. He was also the founder and in the years 1957-1958 first director of the Geological Laboratory, which was later transformed into the Geological Institute of Slovak Academy of Sciences.

== Scientific activities ==
His research interests have been multilateral. His wide interests were devoted to geology, stratigraphy, tectonics, paleontology, geology of deposits and engineering geology. He studied the Klippen and Flysch belt of the Western Carpathians, but also Central Western Carpathians and especially the Subtatric nappes. He demonstrated the existence of large nappes in the Western Carpathians and the extent of several orogenetic phases. He also allocated a number of tectonic units and brought paleogeographic picture of the Carpathian geosyncline during the Mesozoic. The results of his research enhanced knowledge of particular tectonic and stratigraphic units of the Western Carpathians and became the foundation of the modern understanding of their structure and relationship to adjacent geological units.

His scientific work is ranked among the leading European geologists. The results of his research were summarized in a five volume monograph The Geological research of Klippen zone of the Western Carpathians (1931 - 1955), Apercu de la Géologie des Carpathes occidentales de la Slovauie centrale (1931), three volumes of The Geology of Czechoslovak Carpathians (1958 - 1965) and monograph Grundriss der Tektonik der Nördlichen Karpaten (1968), which is considered one of the highlights of synthesis of the tectonic structure of the Western Carpathians based on the principles of the geosyncline theory. He was the author of many other monographic works and about 250 papers in scientific journals in Czechoslovakia and abroad. In addition to scientific activities he also solved practical geological tasks related to construction of dams, railways, tunnels and searching for non-metallic deposits.
