= Jelšovec =

Jelšovec Jelsőc
- Municipality
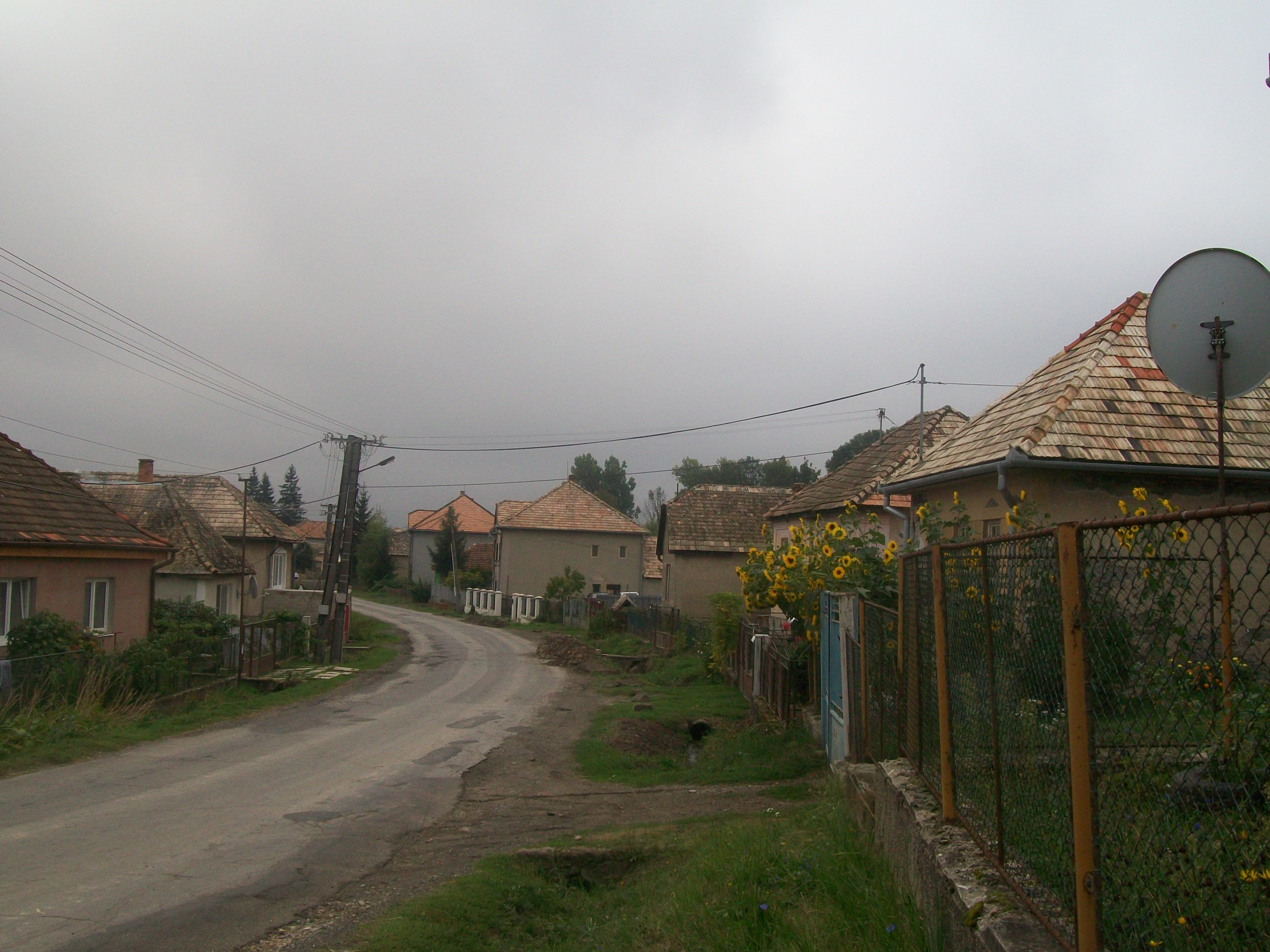

- Flag

- Location of Jelšovec in the Banská Bystrica Region Location of Jelšovec in Slovakia
- Coordinates: 48.28°N 19.60°E
- Country: Slovakia
- Region: Banská Bystrica Region
- District: Lučenec District
- First mentioned: 1573

Area
  - Total: 8.18 km^{2} (3.16 sq mi)
- Elevation: 174 m (571 ft)

Population (2025)
  - Total: 298
- Time zone: UTC+1 (CET)
  - Summer (DST): UTC+2 (CEST)
- Postal code: 985 32
- Area code: +421 47
- Vehicle registration plate (until 2022): LC
- Website: www.jelsovec.sk

Jelšovec (Hungarian: Jelsőc) is a village and municipality in the Lučenec District in the Banská Bystrica Region of Slovakia.

== Geography ==
The municipality lies at an altitude of 174 metres (571 ft) and covers an area of 8.18 km^{2} (3.16 sq mi) (2025).

== History ==
In historical records, the village was first mentioned in 1573 (Jelsewcz, Jelsoch). It belonged to Somoskō castle and in the 17th century to Halič. Until the Treaty of Trianon in 1920, it belonged to Hungary and from 1938 to 1945 again.

== Population ==
Population statistic (10 years)
| Year | 1995 | 2005 | 2015 | 2025 |
|---|---|---|---|---|
| Count | 197 | 274 | 316 | 298 |
| Difference | | +39.08% | +15.32% | −5.69% |

Population statistic
| Year | 2024 | 2025 |
|---|---|---|
| Count | 303 | 298 |
| Difference | | −1.65% |

It has a population of 298 people (31 December 2025).

=== Ethnicity ===
Census 2021 (1+ %)
| Ethnicity | Number | Fraction |
|---|---|---|
| Slovak | 242 | 73.11% |
| Not found out | 63 | 19.03% |
| Hungarian | 28 | 8.45% |
| Czech | 8 | 2.41% |
| Total | 331 | |

In year 2021 was 331 people by ethnicity 242 as Slovak, 63 as Not found out, 28 as Hungarian, 8 as Czech and 2 as Romani.

Note on population: The difference values of population numbers in the table "Population statistic" and in the sections "Ethnicity" & "Religion" is caused by the use of various statistical methods.

=== Religion ===
Census 2021 (1+ %)
| Religion | Number | Fraction |
|---|---|---|
| Roman Catholic Church | 184 | 55.59% |
| Not found out | 64 | 19.34% |
| None | 51 | 15.41% |
| Christian Congregations in Slovakia | 9 | 2.72% |
| Evangelical Church | 8 | 2.42% |
| Other and not ascertained christian church | 4 | 1.21% |
| Greek Catholic Church | 4 | 1.21% |
| Total | 331 | |

In year 2021 was 331 people by religion 184 from Roman Catholic Church, 64 from Not found out, 51 from None, 9 from Christian Congregations in Slovakia, 8 from Evangelical Church, 4 from Other and not ascertained christian church, 4 from Greek Catholic Church, 2 from Jehovah's Witnesses, 1 from Old Catholic Church, 1 from Calvinist Church, 1 from Islam, 1 from United Methodist Church and 1 from Church of Jesus Christ of Latter-day Saints.

== Genealogical resources ==
The records for genealogical research are available at the state archive "Statny Archiv in Banska Bystrica, Slovakia"

- Roman Catholic church records (births/marriages/deaths): 1756-1896 (parish B)

== See also ==
- List of municipalities and towns in Slovakia
