= Meliata Ocean =

Ocean that existed in the Mesozoic eras

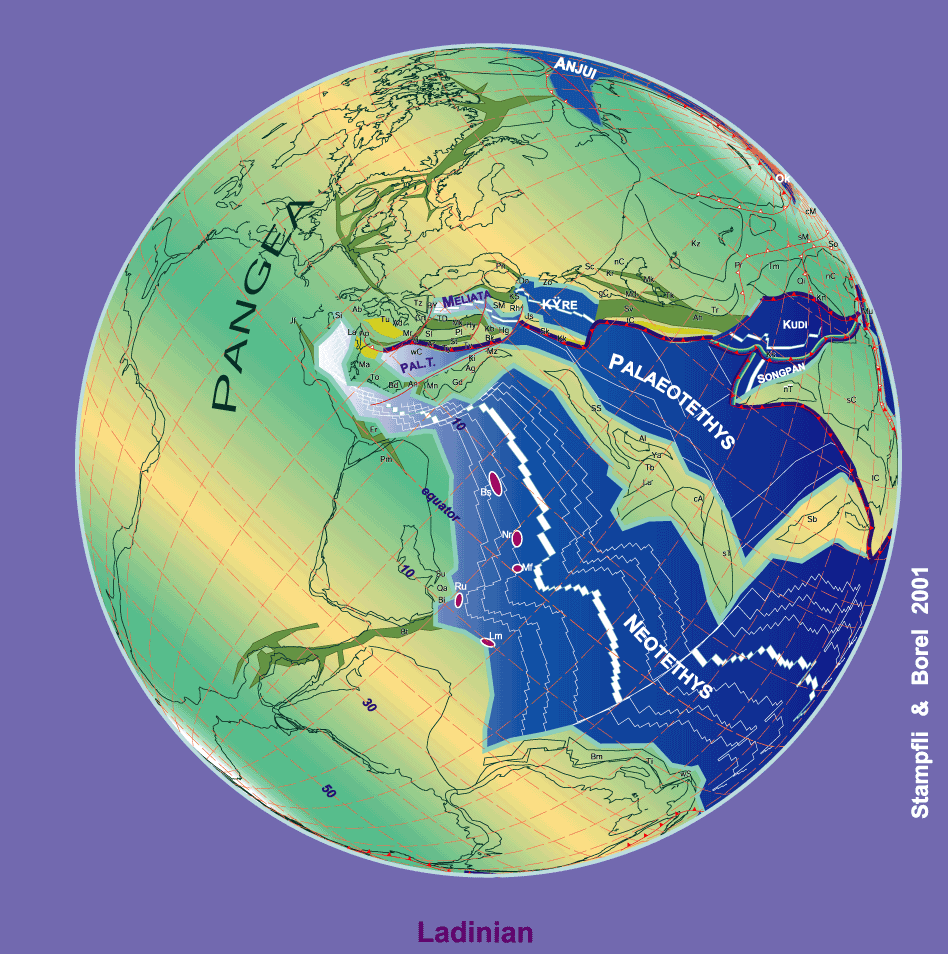
Paleogeography of the Tethyan region in the late Triassic (after Stampfli & Borel) shortly before sea-floor spreading ended in the Meliata Ocean, which is located above the centre of the image.

The Meliata Ocean (also referred to as the Meliata-Hallstatt Ocean) was a short-lived oceanic rift basin in the Mesozoic which lay in the NW part of the Tethys Ocean as an eastward opening oceanic embayment to Adria.

== Timing and location ==
The Meliata Ocean has been interpreted as a back-arc basin related to northward subduction of Palaeotethys. The main basin-forming rifting began during the Anisian stage of the Triassic. Seafloor spreading ended at the beginning of the Middle Carnian. Subduction of the basin began in the latest Triassic with the final closing of the ocean, accompanied by uplift of the adjacent marginal areas, dated as basal Oxfordian.

Fragments of the ocean floor were later obducted. Those fragments, along with some of the marine sediments which were deposited in the basin, can be found in the Western Carpathians. They include the Meliata Mélange which is particularly well exposed in the Muráň river in the small village of Meliata in southern Slovakia. The Meliata nappe of the Western Carpathians includes fragments of upper Jurassic blueschist-bearing ophiolite which are interpreted as evidence for the subduction of the Meliata ocean.

The closure of the basin caused deformation beyond the Carpathians and it has been argued that the Eoalpine orogeny in the Cretaceous, which led to the assembly of the Austroalpine nappe system, was related to the collisional event that caused the closure of the Meliata Ocean.

The Meliata suture zone itself is obscured by the Upper Austroalpine nappes.
