= Western Carpathians =

Mountain range in Europe

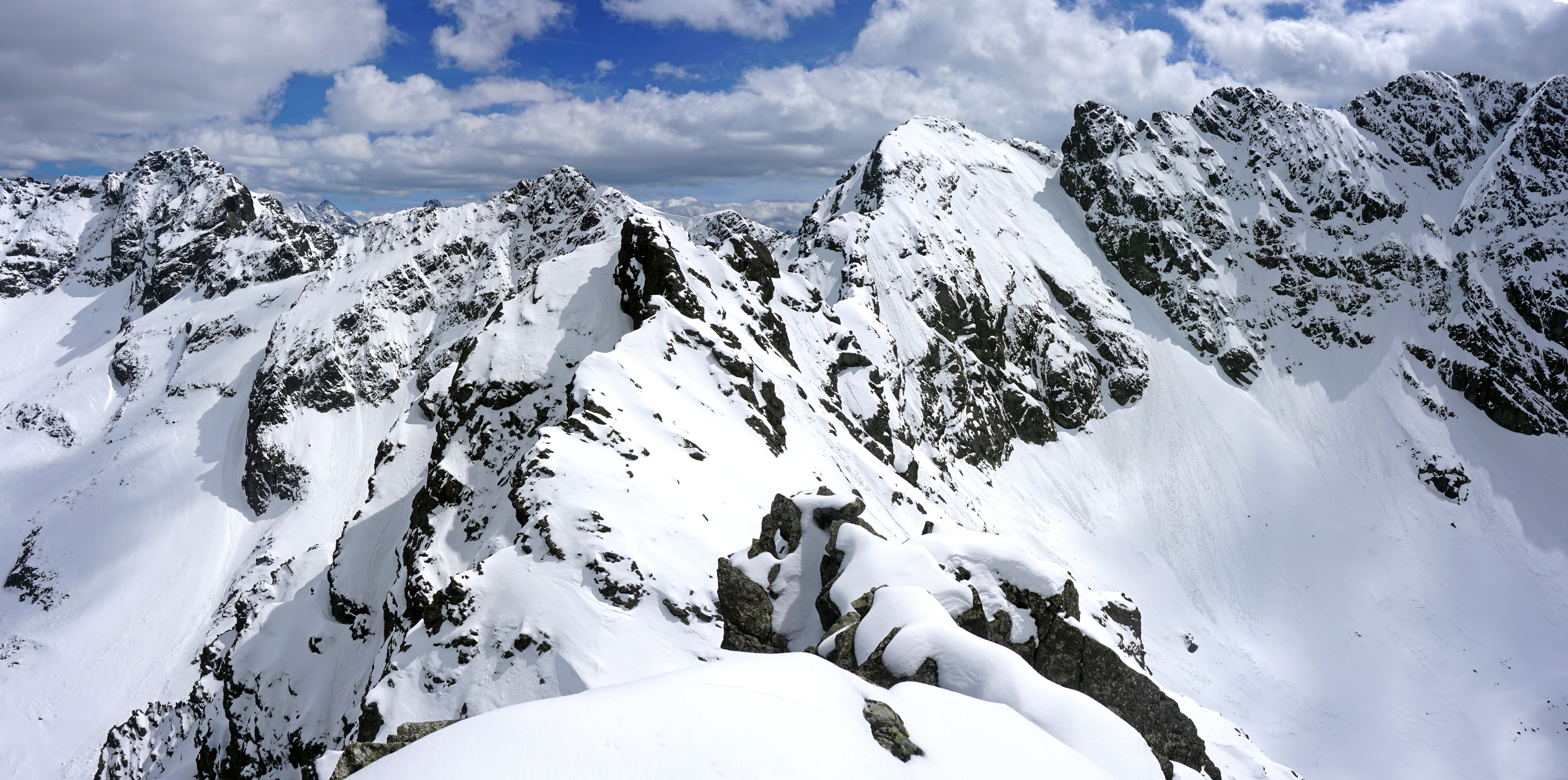
- Panoramic view from Kościelec, High Tatras, Poland. Peaks from left to right: Kozi Wierch, Mały Kozi Wierch, Zawratowa Turnia, Niebieska Turnia, Gąsienicowa Turnia, and Świnica.

Highest point
- Peak: Gerlachovský štít
- Elevation: 2,655 m (8,711 ft)
- Coordinates: 49°10′2″N 20°7′52″E

Geography
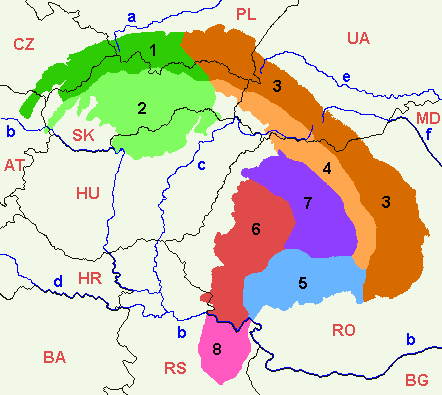
- Carpathian Mountains, Western Carpathians in green (1=Outer Western Carpathians, 2=Inner Western Carpathians)
- Countries: Slovakia, Austria, Czech Republic, Poland and Hungary
- Regions: Lesser Poland, Moravia and Weinviertel
- Parent range: Carpathian Mountains

Geology
- Orogeny: alpine orogeny
- Rock type(s): granite, limestone, sandstone, andesite

The Western Carpathians (Czech: Západní Karpaty) are a mountain range and geomorphological province that forms the western part of the Carpathian Mountains.

The mountain belt stretches from the Low Beskids range of the Eastern Carpathians along the border of Poland with Slovakia toward the Moravian region of the Czech Republic and the Austrian Weinviertel. In the south the North Hungarian Mountains cover northern Hungary. The area of the Western Carpathians comprises about 70,000 km^{2}. The highest elevation is the Gerlachovský štít (2,655m) situated in the High Tatra Mountains.

== Geographical definition ==
Most of the perimeter of the Western Carpathians is quite sharply defined by valleys. To the northwest and north they are separated from the Bohemian Massif by the Outer Subcarpathia and the Lesser Poland Upland; to the west the Moravian Gate leads over to the Sudetes. To the south the mountain chain falls away towards the Pannonian Plain, a large plain situated between the Alps, the Dinaric Alps, and the main mass of the Eastern Carpathians.

The boundary between the Western Carpathians and the Eastern Alps is formed by the Vienna Basin, the Hainburg Hills of the Little Carpathians at Devín Gate, and a gap carved by the Danube. To the east and northeast the mountains are bounded by the East Slovak and Sandomierz Basins, but it is less striking and passes through highland terrain that continues to the Eastern Carpathians.

== Geology ==
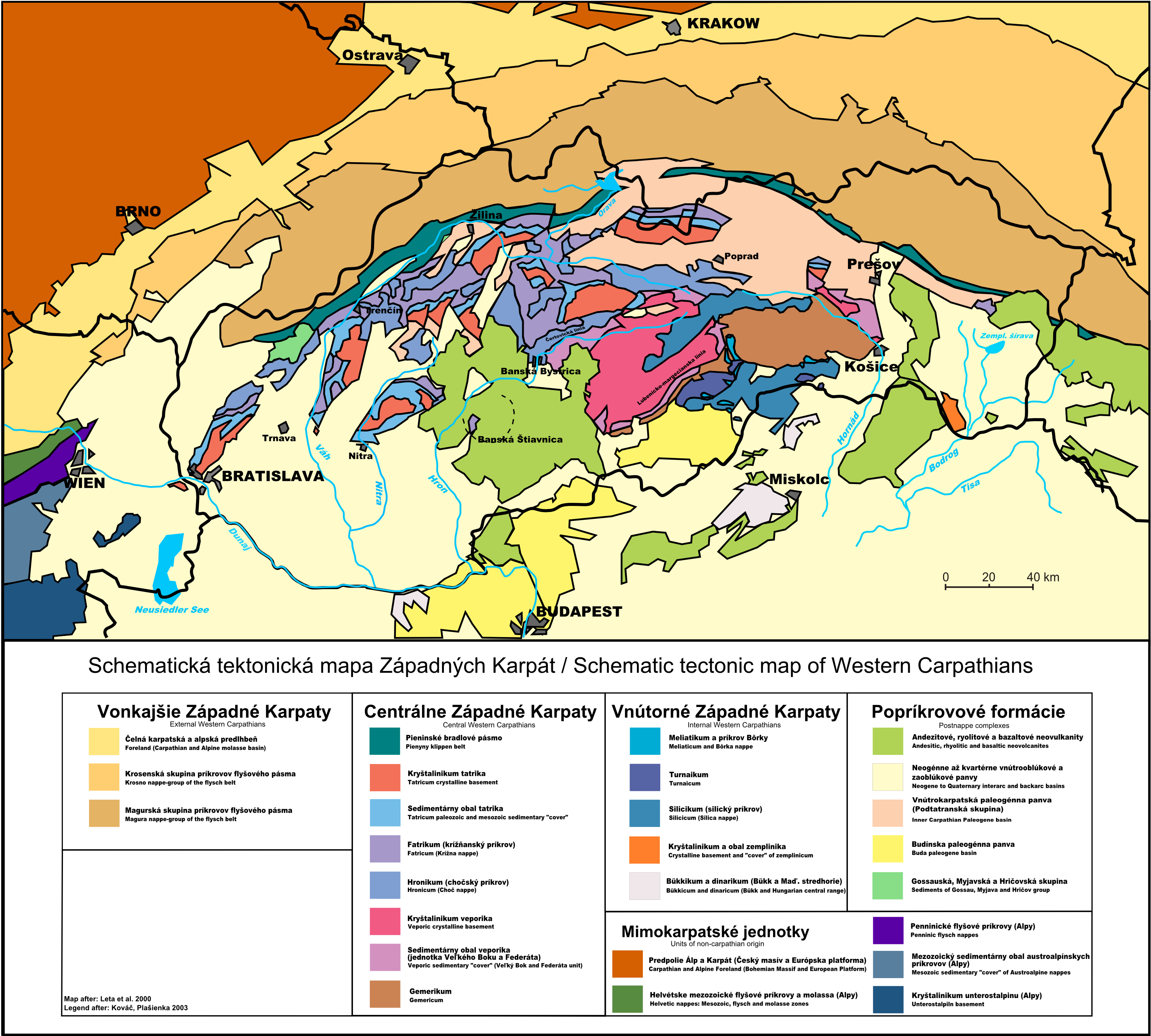
Geological map of Western Carpathians

The Western Carpathians are part of the northern branch of alpine orogeny, which was formed by the closure of the Tethys Ocean millions of years ago.

The Western Carpathians are part of the Alpide belt. To the west they longitudinally join the Alps, but the exact boundary is hidden under the Neogene sedimentary fill of the Vienna Basin. To the east, their boundary with the Eastern Carpathians is the valley of the Hornád or Uzh River. The northern boundary with the East European craton and Bohemian Massif is well marked by the thrust of nappes of the Carpathian Flysch Belt. The southern boundary is less clear, because later postorogenetic evolution caused formation of basins, penetrating the mountain chain non-uniformly.

The Western Carpathians have a complicated geological structure, that has been formed since the Paleozoic era. The oldest Paleozoic rocks experienced the first stage of deformation during the Hercynian orogeny, but younger Alpine overprint is common. Alpine orogeny affected the area in several stages from Jurassic to Neogene. During this period, parts of Tethys Ocean were subducted under the Adriatic Plate and Western Carpathian blocks were thrust over the margin of the Eurasian Plate.

Tectonic units of the Western Carpathians are arranged in belt-like order, with the external units in the north and internal units in the south. Alpine evolution of the Western Carpathians is dominated by extension and closure of two or three oceanic domains: Triassic-Jurassic Meliata-Halstatt Ocean, Jurassic-Cretaceous Piemont-Vahic Ocean/Zone and Cretaceous-Tertiary Valais-Magura Ocean. After subduction of the Meliata Ocean, the Inner Western Carpathians were formed. Suturing of Vahic domain finalized thrusting in the Central Western Carpathians, and consuming the crust of Carpathian Flysch Basins caused the formation of the Outer Western Carpathian accretionary wedge (Carpathian Flysch Belt).
