= Pinciná =

Pinciná Pinc
- Municipality
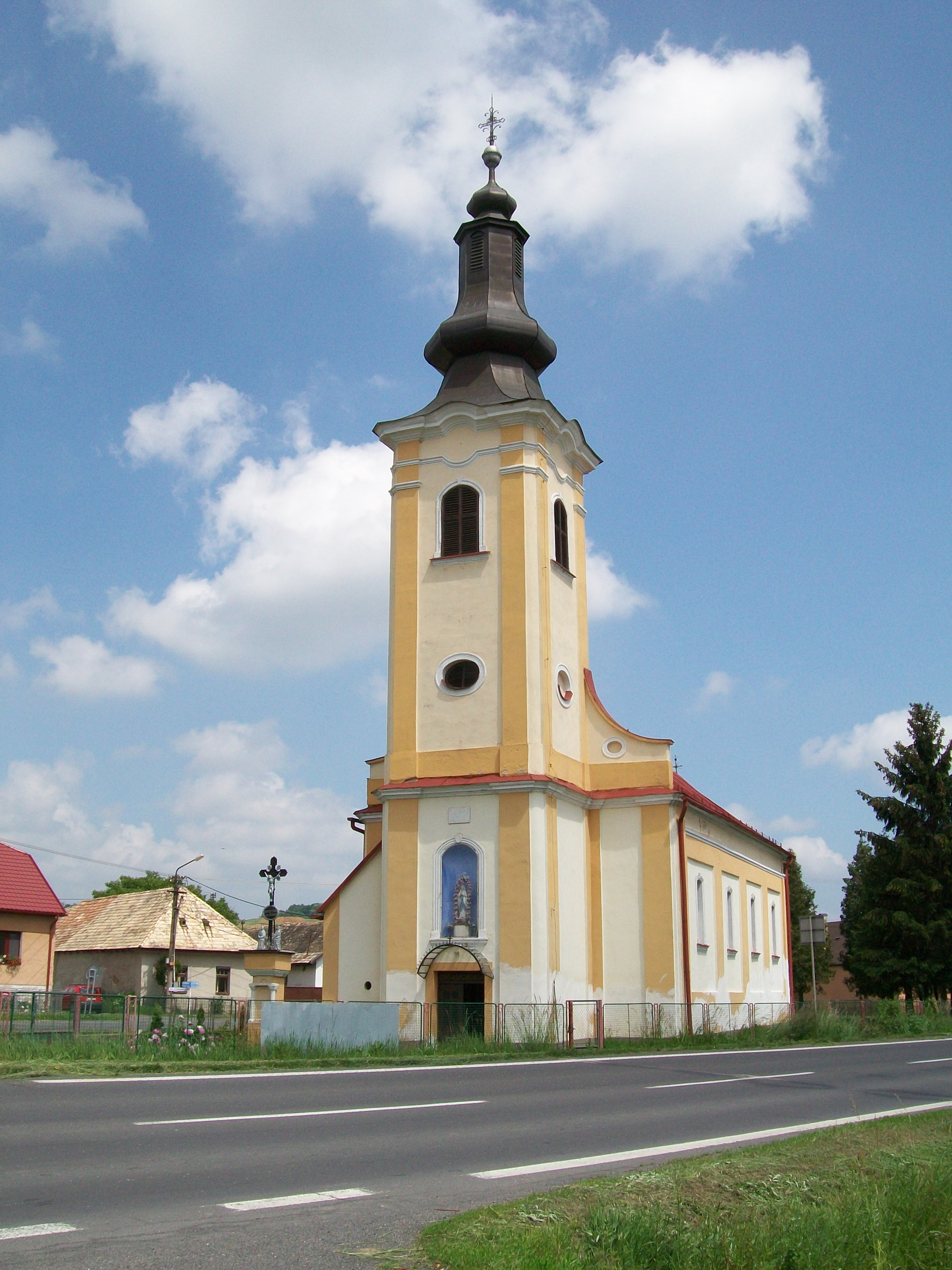
- Roman Catholic church in Pinciná

- Flag

- Location of Pinciná in the Banská Bystrica Region Location of Pinciná in Slovakia
- Coordinates: 48.37°N 19.77°E
- Country: Slovakia
- Region: Banská Bystrica Region
- District: Lučenec District
- First mentioned: 1326

Area
  - Total: 11.91 km^{2} (4.60 sq mi)
- Elevation: 190 m (620 ft)

Population (2025)
  - Total: 196
- Time zone: UTC+1 (CET)
  - Summer (DST): UTC+2 (CEST)
- Postal code: 984 01
- Area code: +421 47
- Vehicle registration plate (until 2022): LC
- Website: www.pincina.sk

Pinciná (Hungarian: Pinc) is a village and municipality in Lučenec District in the Banská Bystrica Region of southern central Slovakia.

== History ==
In historical records the village was first mentioned in 1326.

== Geography ==
The municipality lies at an altitude of 190 metres (620 ft) and covers an area of 11.91 km^{2} (4.60 sq mi) (2025).

== Population ==
Population statistic (10 years)
Year	1995	2005	2015	2025
Count	263	246	235	196
Difference		−6.46%	−4.47%	−16.59%

Population statistic
Year	2024	2025
Count	199	196
Difference		−1.50%

It has a population of 196 people (31 December 2025).

=== Ethnicity ===
Census 2021 (1+ %)
Ethnicity	Number	Fraction
Slovak	132	63.46%
Hungarian	81	38.94%
Not found out	6	2.88%
Total	208	

In year 2021 was 208 people by ethnicity 132 as Slovak, 81 as Hungarian, 6 as Not found out and 1 as Czech.

Note on population: The difference values of population numbers in the table "Population statistic" and in the sections "Ethnicity" & "Religion" is caused by the use of various statistical methods.

=== Religion ===
Census 2021 (1+ %)
Religion	Number	Fraction
Roman Catholic Church	170	81.73%
None	24	11.54%
Evangelical Church	9	4.33%
Not found out	3	1.44%
Total	208	

In year 2021 was 208 people by religion 170 from Roman Catholic Church, 24 from None, 9 from Evangelical Church, 3 from Not found out, 1 from Calvinist Church and 1 from Ad hoc movements.
