= Pieniny Klippen Belt =

Zone in the Western Carpathians, with a very complex geological structure

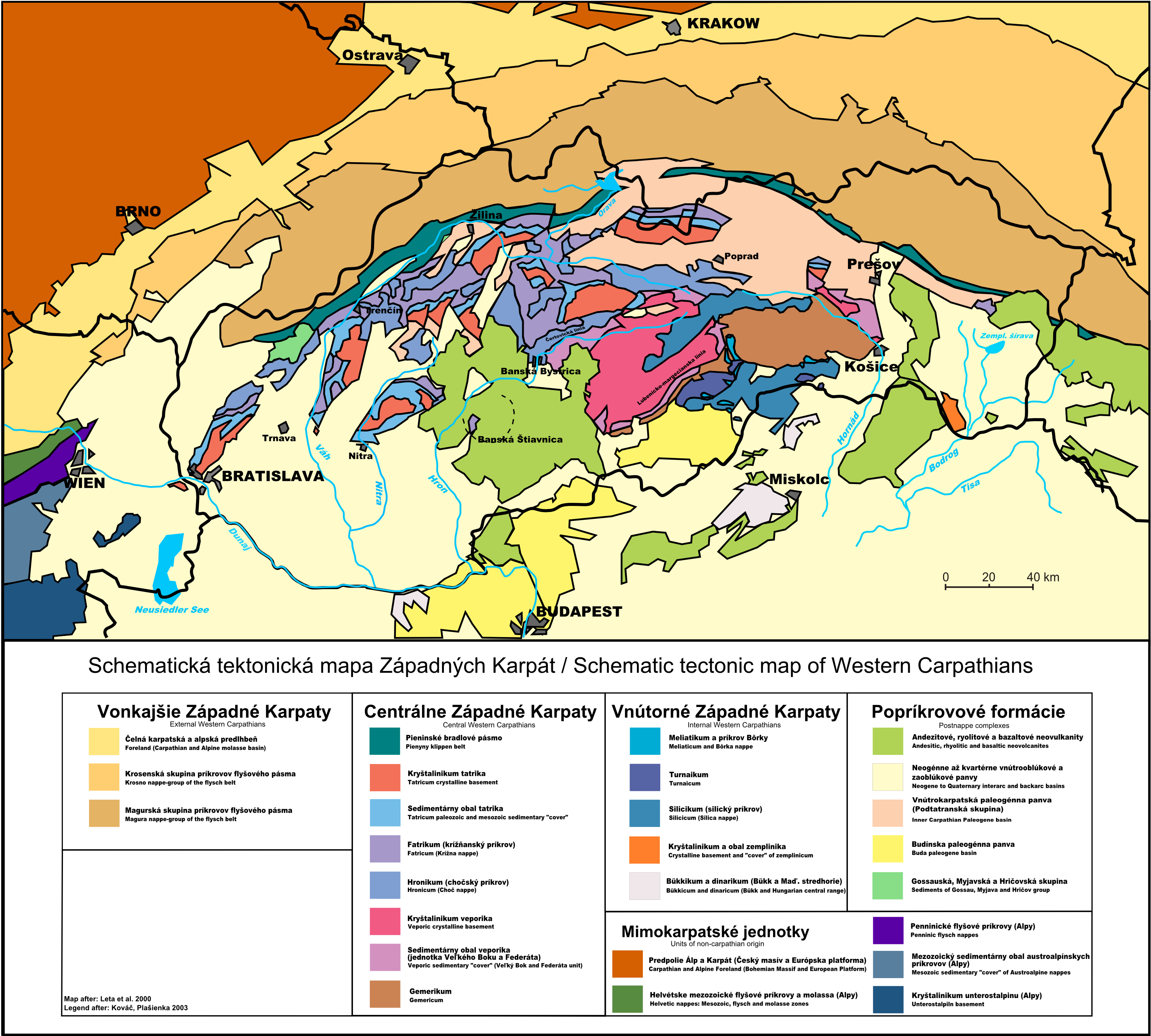
Geological map of Western Carpathians Pieniny Klippen Belt

The Pieniny Klippen Belt is in geology a tectonically and orographically remarkable zone in the Western Carpathians, with a very complex geological structure. It is a narrow (only 0.4 to 19 km) and extremely long (about 600 km) north banded zone of extreme shortening and sub-vertical strike-slip fault zone, with complex geological history, where only fragments of individual strata and facies are preserved. The Pieniny Klippen Belt is considered one of the main tectonic sutures of the Carpathians and forms the boundary between the Outer (external thin-skin thrustbelt) and Central Western Carpathians (internal thick-skin thrustbelt).

The Pieniny Klippen Belt emerges from beneath the Neogene sediments of the Vienna Basin near Podbranč in western Slovakia and continues eastward to Poland, where it bends and returns to Slovakia in the area of Pieniny. The klippen belt then continues to Ukraine and ends in Romania. In some places it is covered with younger deposits, for example in the Podhale basin in Poland, or in the Vihorlat Mountains in Slovakia.

Klippes, which are the most characteristic features of the belt, are Jurassic to lower Cretaceous lenses - rigid blocks of limestone, tectonically separated from their unknown substratum. These blocks are also cropping out in tectonic windows in the overlying middle Cretaceous to Paleogene sediments. Strong tectonic deformation is a result of two main phases during the Alpine orogeny. The oldest phase is called the Laramide phase or Jarmuta phase and occurred in the Cretaceous and Paleogene periods. It caused thrusting of the nappes. The second phase is called the Savian or Helvetian phase. It was induced by subduction of the Northern Penninic ocean and caused the formation of the Carpathian Flysch Belt.

== Geological structure ==
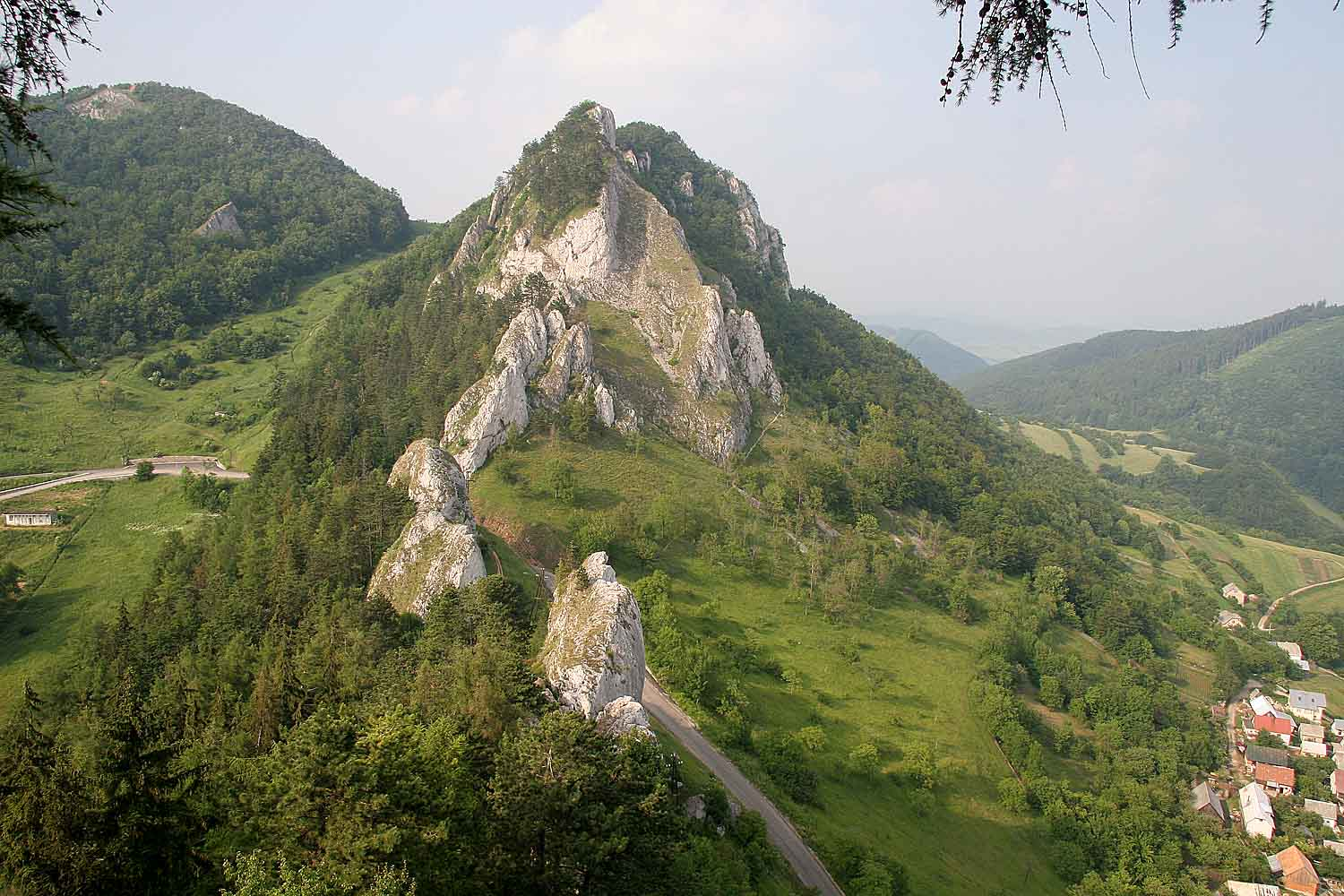
Vršatec klippe, in Slovakia is the largest Czorsztyn type klippe

The Pieniny Klippen Belt is divided into numerous tectonic units, but only few of them occur throughout the entire belt. The oldest rocks of the Klippen belt are Middle Jurassic to upper Cretaceous. They are in normal stratigraphical positions, with only minor hiatus. Large scale crustal shortening caused rocks of different tectonic units and origin to be thrusted over each other and now lying juxtaposed. These tectonic units are:

1. The Czorsztyn unit, named after Czorsztyn in Poland, is found in the most northern part of the Klippen Belt. It consists of shallow marine sediments, usually Jurassic nodular limestones and Cretaceous so called couches rouges marlstones.
2. The Kysuca unit (also known as Kysuca-Pieniny unit). The Jurassic sediments of this unit are mostly deep marine in origin (typical radiolarites). Most of the other tectonic units were deposited between the shallow Czorsztyn and deep marine Kysuca unit.
3. the Pruske unit (also known as the Niedzica or Czertezik unit) has a transitional facies between shallow and deep marine environments.
4. The Klape unit composed of cretaceous turbiditic sediments containing exotic conglomerates with pebbles from an unknown source area. It is probably an accretionary wedge or some unknown terrane carried by the Fatric, but its origin is still a subject of discussion.
5. Orava unit with typical limestones with unique ammonite fauna, typical klippes occur only in Orava region.
6. The Manín unit contains typical Urgonian limestone. It has only partially a tectonic style of klippes, It is usually assigned to the Fatricum as well as the Drietoma and Haligovce units. Its origin is still disputed, because some geologists consider it a proximal part of the Tatric sedimentary cover.

The Czorsztyn unit has the shallowest marine facies. Together with smaller continental slope units and the deep marine Kysuca unit it forms a continental domain called the Oravicum, which is geometrically equivalent to the Briançonnais microcontinent in the Western and Central Alps.

== Development ==
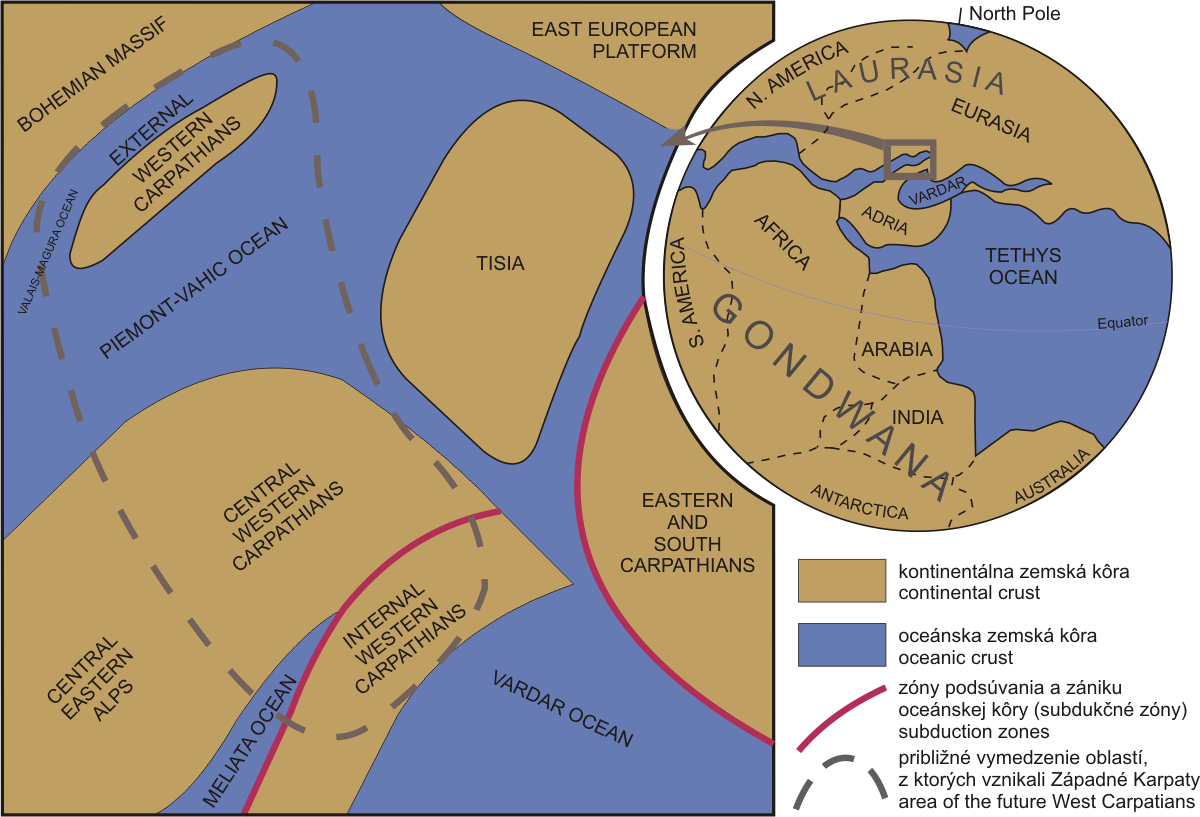
Paleogeographic situation in the Western Carpathian realm during the Late Jurassic

Reconstruction of the older phases of development is not possible because of absence of pre-Triassic rocks. The development of Pieniny Klippen Belt started on the passive margin of the European platform in Lower Jurassic with rifting and tectonic subsidence of the Oravic unit. During the Middle Jurassic to lowermost Cretaceous an elevated continental ribbon called the Czorsztyn Ridge evolved due to the thermal uplift and continental break-up at the southern side of the Czorsztyn Ridge. Rifting resulted in the opening of a basinal area called the Kysuca basin or Vahic Ocean (South Penninic or Piemont ocean equivalent) to the south of the Oravic area. In the Late Jurassic, the entire Oravic domain began to thermally subside. Since the earliest Cretaceous, asymmetrical rifting probably affected the area to the north of the Czorsztyn Ridge where the Magura basin (North Penninic or Valais Ocean equivalent) started to form.

During the Middle Cretaceous, thermal subsidence of the Czorsztyn Ridge caused its development into a pelagic high. In Turonian times frontal elements of the Fatric Nappe System of the Inner Western Carpathians were emplaced onto the southern parts of the Vahic Ocean. From the Late Cretaceous to the Paleocene, the Vahic Ocean began to close. The Oravic units were detached from their subducting basement and formed a fold and thrust belt. After the first phase of folding and thrusting, sedimentation of turbiditic sequences was restored. The area was again deformed in a second phase of orogeny in the late Paleogene and Early Miocene when sinistral transpression and amalgamation with the hinterland part of the closed Magura Ocean caused formation of "klippen" due to counter-clockwise rotation of the ALCAPA microplate. During this times several subduction related calc-alcaline volcanoes locally evolved in the area. Later sinistral transtension and lateral extension modified the structure of the belt during the Late Miocene and Pliocene. Extensional deformation on the eastern and western edge of the belt interacted with development of the Vienna Basin and the Transcarpathian Basin. After the marine regression at the end of the Miocene, younger marls and turbidites were eroded faster than more competent Jurassic limestones forming klippen.

Ground movement measurements indicate that the Pieniny Klippen Belt is tectonically active, with slow deformation associated with overthrusting. This movement may be associated with weak seismic events. A 2018 earthquake in Poland, with a magnitude of M_{w} 4.7, had a focal mechanism characteristic of tectonic overthrusting.
