= Flysch =

Type of sedimentary rock sequence

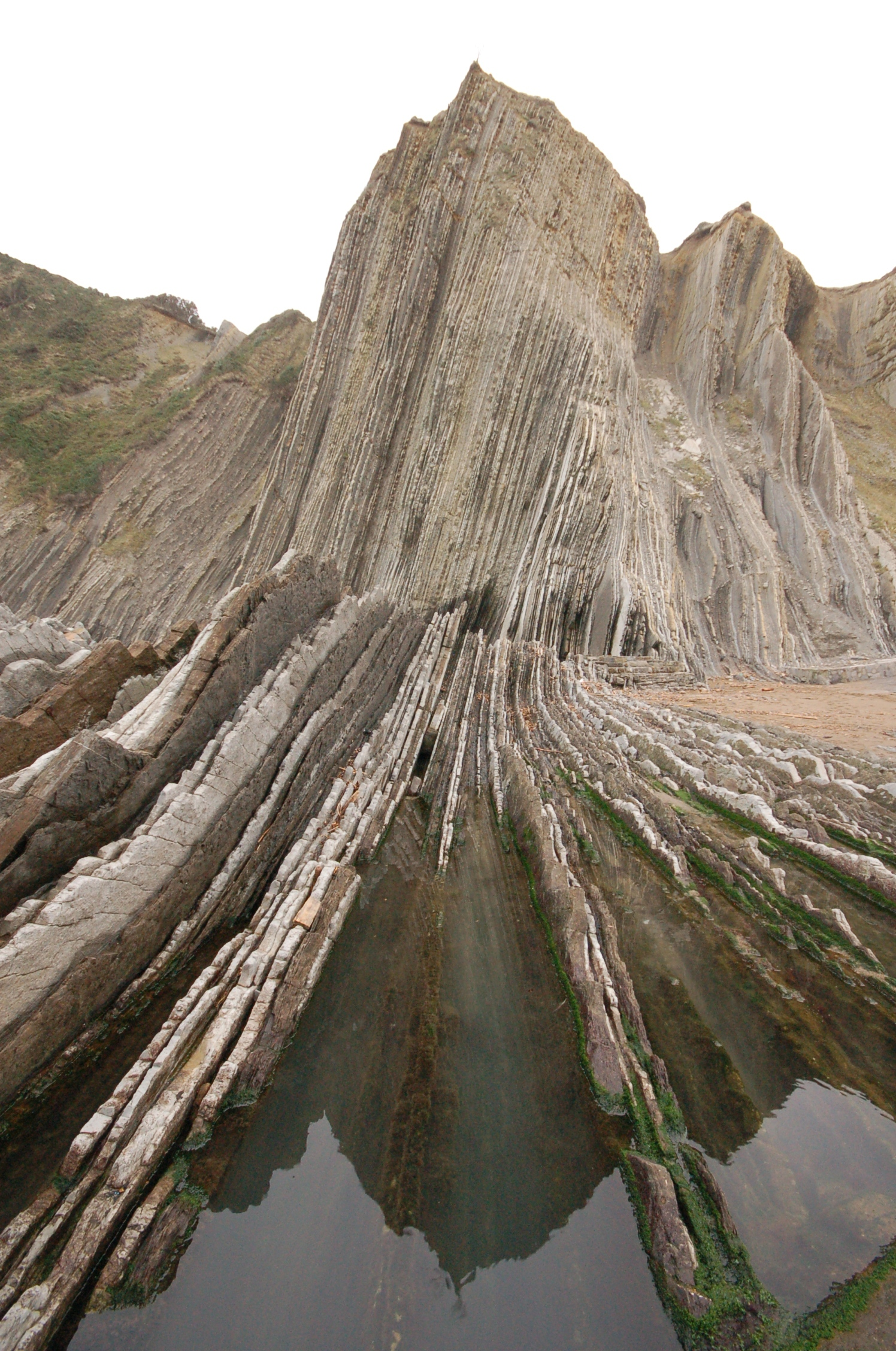
Steeply-tilted layers of flysch on the coast of Bay of Biscay, at Zumaia, Basque Country, Spain

Flysch (/flɪʃ/) is a sequence of sedimentary rock layers that progress from deep-water and turbidity flow deposits to shallow-water shales and sandstones. It is deposited when a deep basin forms rapidly on the continental side of a mountain building episode. Examples are found near the North American Cordillera, the Alps, the Pyrenees and the Carpathians.

== Sedimentological properties ==
Flysch consists of repeated sedimentary cycles with upwards fining of the sediments. There are sometimes coarse conglomerates or breccias at the bottom of each cycle, which gradually evolve upwards into sandstone and shale/mudstone. Flysch typically consists of a sequence of shales rhythmically interbedded with thin, hard, graywacke-like sandstones. Typically the shales do not contain many fossils, while the coarser sandstones often have fractions of micas and glauconite.

== Tectonics ==
In a continental collision, a subducting tectonic plate pushes on the plate above it, making the rock fold, often to the point where thrust faults form, and a mountain chain rises. On the upper plate, the land between the mountains and the undeformed continent bends downward, forming a foreland basin. If the basin forms slowly, as in the northern Appalachians, it fills with shallow-water sediments. If it forms rapidly, as in the east side of the North American Cordillera, then sea water may rush in, and the first sedimentary deposits are deep water deposits. If the mountain slope is steep enough at the edge of the basin, it will shed material in rapidly moving sedimentary flows called turbidity currents, resulting in turbidite deposits. As the basin fills up, shallow-water sandstones and continental deposits form. Most of the resulting rocks have little deformation, but near the edge of the mountain chain they can be subject to folding and thrusting. After the basin fills up, continental sediments (molasse) are deposited on top of the flysch.

== Name and use ==
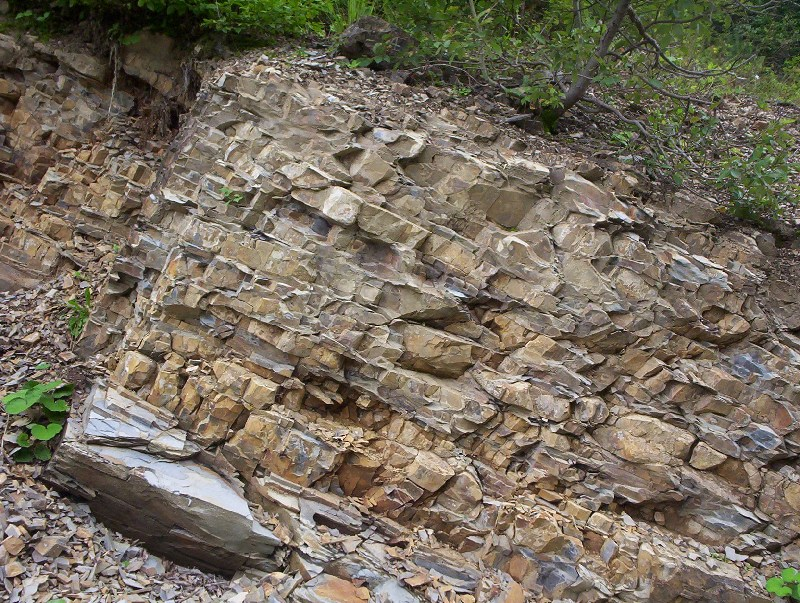
Carpathian flysch

The name flysch was introduced in geologic literature by the Swiss geologist Bernhard Studer in 1827. Studer used the term for the typical alternations of sandstone and shale in the foreland of the Alps. The name comes from the German word fliessen, which means to flow, because Studer thought flysch was deposited by rivers. The insight that flysch is actually a deep marine sediment typical for a particular plate tectonic setting came only much later.

The name flysch is currently used in many mountain chains belonging to the Alpine belt. Well-known flysch deposits are found in the forelands of the Pyrenees and Carpathians and in tectonically similar regions in Italy, the Balkans and on Cyprus. In the northern Alps, the Flysch is also a lithostratigraphic unit.
