= Meliata =

Village and municipality in Slovakia

Meliata Melléte
- Municipality
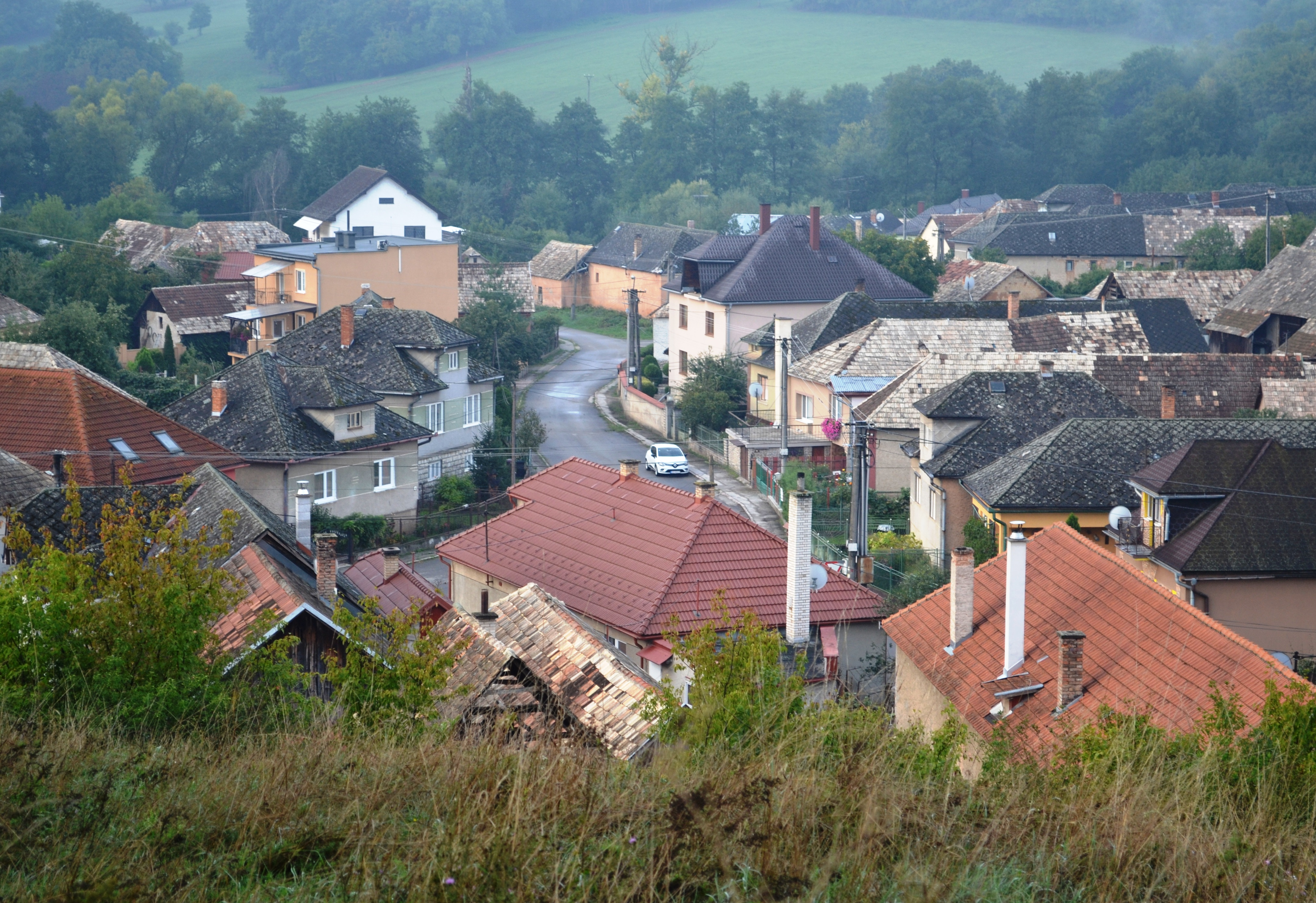

- Flag

- Location of Meliata in the Košice Region Location of Meliata in Slovakia
- Coordinates: 48.52°N 20.33°E
- Country: Slovakia
- Region: Košice Region
- District: Rožňava District
- First mentioned: 1243

Area
  - Total: 14.49 km^{2} (5.59 sq mi)
- Elevation: 201 m (659 ft)

Population (2025)
  - Total: 171
- Time zone: UTC+1 (CET)
  - Summer (DST): UTC+2 (CEST)
- Postal code: 491 2
- Area code: +421 58
- Vehicle registration plate (until 2022): RV
- Website: www.meliata.sk

Meliata (Hungarian: Melléte) is a village and municipality in the Rožňava District in the Košice Region of middle-eastern Slovakia.

== History ==
In historical records the village was first mentioned in 1243. Before the establishment of independent Czechoslovakia in 1918, Meliata was part of Gömör and Kishont County within the Kingdom of Hungary. From 1938 to 1945, it was again part of Hungary as a result of the First Vienna Award.

== Geography ==
The municipality lies at an altitude of 201 metres (659 ft) and covers an area of 14.49 km^{2} (5.59 sq mi) (2025).

== Population ==
Population statistic (10 years)
Year	1995	2005	2015	2025
Count	250	220	204	171
Difference		−12%	−7.27%	−16.17%

Population statistic
Year	2024	2025
Count	169	171
Difference		+1.18%

It has a population of 171 people (31 December 2025).

=== Ethnicity ===
Census 2021 (1+ %)
Ethnicity	Number	Fraction
Hungarian	124	67.75%
Slovak	62	33.87%
Not found out	14	7.65%
Romani	2	1.09%
Total	183	

In year 2021 was 183 people by ethnicity 124 as Hungarian, 62 as Slovak, 14 as Not found out, 2 as Romani and 1 as Czech.

Note on population: The difference values of population numbers in the table "Population statistic" and in the sections "Ethnicity" & "Religion" is caused by the use of various statistical methods.

=== Religion ===
Census 2021 (1+ %)
Religion	Number	Fraction
None	58	31.69%
Roman Catholic Church	48	26.23%
Calvinist Church	30	16.39%
Evangelical Church	23	12.57%
Not found out	10	5.46%
Old Catholic Church	6	3.28%
Greek Catholic Church	4	2.19%
Jehovah's Witnesses	2	1.09%
Total	183	

In year 2021 was 183 people by religion 58 from None, 48 from Roman Catholic Church, 30 from Calvinist Church, 23 from Evangelical Church, 10 from Not found out, 6 from Old Catholic Church, 4 from Greek Catholic Church, 2 from Jehovah's Witnesses, 1 from Christian Congregations in Slovakia and 1 from United Methodist Church.

== Culture ==
The village has a public library and a football pitch. The mayor of the village is Csaba Husaník.
