= Zemplín Mountains =

Mountain range in Slovakia

Coordinates: 48°27′N 21°43′E

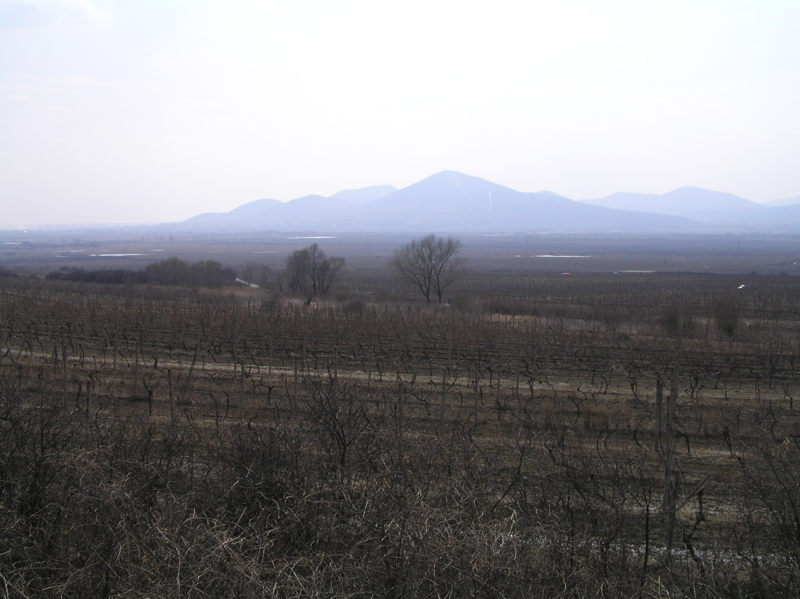
Tokaj-Hegyalja vineyards, with the Zemplín Mountains in the background

The Zemplín Mountains is a small mountain range in southeastern Slovakia, geologically part of the Mátra-Slanec Area of the Inner Western Carpathians.

The range of about 101 square kilometers is near the border of Hungary and its Tokaj wine region. The highest mountain of the range is Rozhladňa (469 meters). An important river is Roňava which also forms the border with Hungary; another river with its headwaters here is the Bodrog.
