= Carpathian Flysch Belt =

Tectonic zone in the Carpathian Mountains

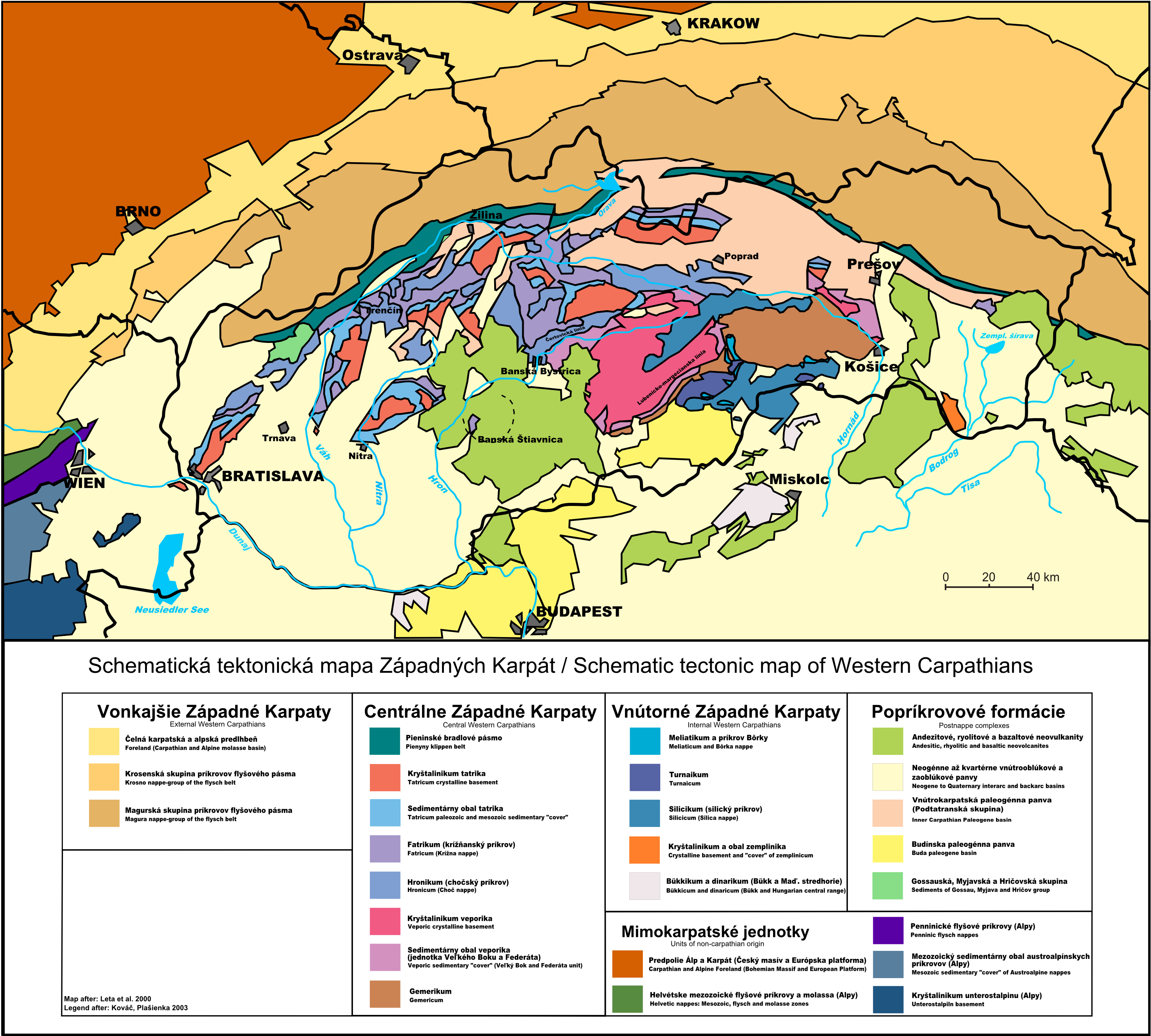
Tectonic map of the Western Carpathians.

The Carpathian Flysch Belt is an arcuate tectonic zone included in the megastructural elevation of the Carpathians on the external periphery of the mountain chain. Geomorphologically it is a portion of the Outer Carpathians. Geologically it is a thin-skinned thrust belt or accretionary wedge, formed by rootless nappes consisting of flysch – alternating marine deposits of claystones, shales and sandstones which were detached from their substratum and moved tens of kilometers North. The Flysch Belt and the Neogene volcanic complexes are the only extant tectonic zones along the Carpathian arc.

== Areal extent ==
The Carpathian Flysch Belt is connected to the flysch belt of the Alps (Rhenodanubian Flysch) and continues through the territory of the Czech Republic, Slovakia, Poland, Ukraine and Romania. The belt is about 1,300 km long and 60 – 75 km wide. Sequences of the Flysch belt are thrust over the margin of Carpathian foredeep in the north. The foreland of the Flysch belt is built by the Bohemian Massif in the west, East-European Platform in the north and the Moesian Platform in the east. In the south it is bounded by the Pieniny Klippen Belt in its western segment. The southern boundary of the Flysch Belt in the area of the Romanian Carpathians is covered by nappes of the crystalline-Mesozoic zone.

== Geological structure ==
The rocks that became the Carpathian Flysch Belt began as sedimentary rocks which were deposited from the Upper Jurassic to the Cretaceous-Paleogene periods. The flysch belt is a structural remnant of several basins, which developed in front of the advancing ancestral Carpathians and later incorporated in the Tertiary Carpathian fold and thrust belt. The present rocks were detached from their basement during the closure and subduction of basins and pushed into a nappe pile, forming the Carpathian accretionary wedge. The fold axial planes have generally north vergence, north-western in the western sector, northern in the central sector and north-eastern to eastern in the eastern sector. Only the nappes of the South Carpathians have eastern to south-eastern vergence.

The Hodonín – Námestovo – Nowy Sącz – Neresnica zone of negative gravimetric anomaly follows the southern edge of the Bohemian Massif and East-European Platform, where they have been underthrust below the Carpathians. The anomalous crustal thickening, which is especially significant in southeastern Poland and western Ukraine, is probably caused by slab break off. The Earth's crust in this area reaches up to 65 km depth.

The whole area of the flysch belt is affected by extension, locally up to 12 mm per year.

=== Regional division ===
Outer Carpathian tectonic units included in the Carpathian Flysch Belt are divided according to their structural position in the frame of the mountain range. Tectonic units vary not only in their structural position but also in differences in sedimentary sequences and other anomalies. The principal tectonic divisions of the Carpathian Flysch Belt are the:

- Magura nappes (Lower Cretaceous to Eocene) in Northern Carpathians
- Krosno-Silesia nappes (Lower Jurassic to Lower Miocene) in Northern Carpathians
- Moldavide nappes (Lower Cretaceous to Lower Miocene) in Romanian Carpathians

== Evolution ==
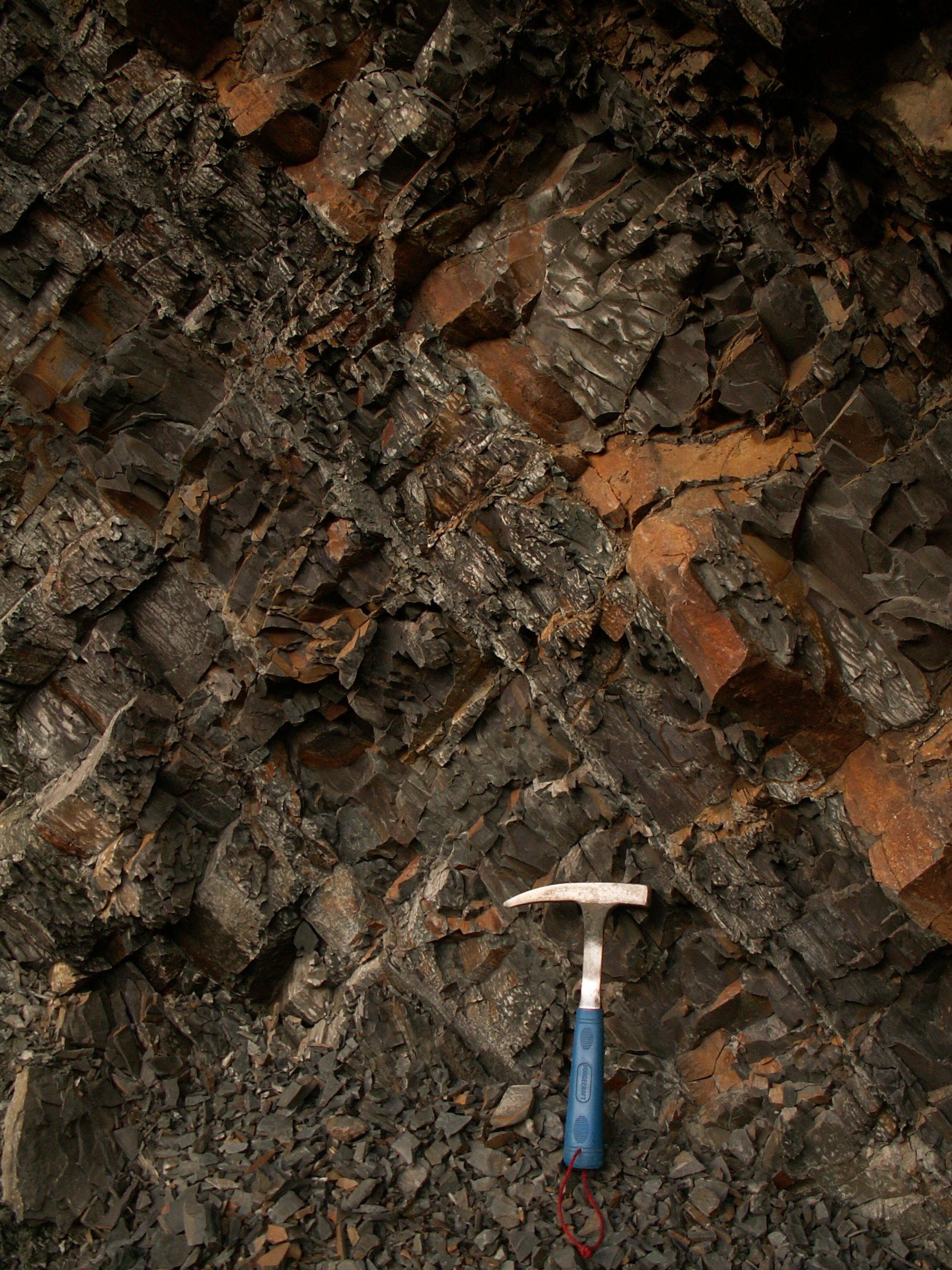
Claystone interval in the Zlín beds of the Cretaceous-Paleocene age turbiditic flysch deposits of the Western Carpathian Rača Unit. Veľké Rovné, Slovakia. Pelagic claystones were deposited between the channel deposits in periods of pelagic sedimentation.

Sedimentation in the basins of the Flysch Belt have been recorded since the Upper Jurassic period until the beginning of Miocene. Basins of the Flysch zone were formed in the Middle Jurassic — Lower Cretaceous period of post-rift subsidence. During the Upper Cretaceous—Paleocene, time inversion occurred locally. In most areas, subsidence continued through the Paleocene to Middle Eocene. Synorogenic closing of the basins followed in Upper Eocene–Lower Miocene. The nappes are mostly composed of turbidites – alternating sandstones and claystones.

In the past it was believed that the source area of the clastic sediments supplied to the basins was built by a system of linear island elevations which were parallel to the axis of the mountain chain. Although such conceptions still remain, recent interpretations assume that material was supplied by submarine canyons from the adjacent shelf areas (e.g. Nesvačilka canyon).

The nappes of the Flysch Belt were thrusted due to subduction of their basement which later formed a fold and thrust belt. Whether the lithosphere of the former flysch basins was oceanic, suboceanic or continental is a matter of debate. Deformation of the belt was gradual.

The area of the Magura Basin was deformed in the Upper Oligocene to Badenian (Middle Miocene). The Silezian and Ždánice units were deformed in the Karpatian to Lower Badenian. The Moldavide Flysch was deformed as early as the Burdigalian, especially in Sarmatian and Badenian. Internal nappes show older Upper Cretaceous deformation. Subduction of the Flysch Belt basement was generally south verging; internal units were therefore thrust over the external ones from the south to north (in the Western sector) or West to East (in Eastern sector). The Tertiary shortening of the Flysch Belt is approximately 130–135 km. Closure of the basins was connected with the motion of the Inner Carpathian crustal blocks, (the so-called lateral extrusion to the East and Northeast ) and intensive Calc-alkaline volcanism in the Carpathian internal zones. Extrusion together with the movement into the “Carpathian embayment” was coeval with prominent rotation of Western Carpathian units in a counter-clockwise direction (up to 90°), and clockwise rotation of Eastern Carpathian units. Loading of the Flysch zone nappes forced subsidence in its foreland, causing formation of the Carpathian foredeep. Also, coeval back-arc extension occurred in the Pannonian region forming a half graben system Pannonian Basin.
