= Accretionary wedge =

Sediments at a convergent plate boundary

Diagram of the geological process of subduction

An accretionary wedge or accretionary prism forms from sediments accreted onto the non-subducting tectonic plate at a convergent plate boundary. Most of the material in the accretionary wedge consists of marine sediments scraped off from the downgoing slab of oceanic crust, but in some cases the wedge includes the erosional products of volcanic island arcs formed on the overriding plate.

An accretionary complex is a current (in modern use) or former accretionary wedge. Accretionary complexes are typically made up of a mix of turbidites of terrestrial material, basalts from the ocean floor, and pelagic and hemipelagic sediments. For example, most of the geological basement of Japan is made up of accretionary complexes.

== Materials within an accretionary wedge ==
Accretionary wedges and accreted terranes are not equivalent to tectonic plates, but rather are associated with tectonic plates and accrete as a result of tectonic collision. Materials incorporated in accretionary wedges include:

- Ocean-floor basalts – typically seamounts scraped off the subducting plate
- Pelagic sediments – typically immediately overlying oceanic crust of the subducting plate
- Trench sediments – typically turbidites that may be derived from:
- Oceanic, volcanic island arc
- Continental volcanic arc and cordilleran orogen
- Adjacent continental masses located along strike (such as Barbados).
- Material transported into the trench by gravity sliding and debris flow from the forearc ridge (olistostrome)
- Piggy-back basins, which are small basins located in surface depression on the accretionary prism.
- Material exposed in the forearc ridge may include fragments of oceanic crust or high pressure metamorphic rocks thrust from deeper in the subduction zone.

Elevated regions within the ocean basins such as linear island chains, ocean ridges, and small crustal fragments (such as Madagascar or Japan), known as terranes, are transported toward the subduction zone and accreted to the continental margin. Since the Late Devonian and Early Carboniferous periods, some 360 million years ago, subduction beneath the western margin of North America has resulted in several collisions with terranes, each producing a mountain-building event. The piecemeal addition of these accreted terranes has added an average of 600 km (370 mi) in width along the western margin of the North American continent.

== Geometry ==
The topographic expression of the accretionary wedge forms a lip, which may dam basins of accumulated materials that, otherwise, would be transported into the trench from the overriding plate. Accretionary wedges are the home of mélange, intensely deformed packages of rocks that lack coherent internal layering and coherent internal order.

The internal structure of an accretionary wedge is similar to that found in a thin-skinned foreland thrust belt. A series of thrusts verging towards the trench are formed with the youngest most outboard structures progressively uplifting the older more inboard thrusts.

The shape of the wedge is determined by how readily the wedge will fail along its basal decollement and in its interior; this is highly sensitive to pore fluid pressure. This failure will result in a mature wedge that has an equilibrium triangular cross-sectional shape of a critical taper. Once the wedge reaches a critical taper, it will maintain that geometry and grow only into a larger similar triangle.

== Significance ==
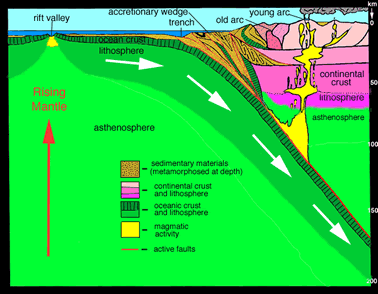
Accretionary wedge (USGS Visual Glossary)

The small sections of oceanic crust that are thrust over the overriding plate are said to be obducted. Where this occurs, rare slices of ocean crust, known as ophiolites, are preserved on land. They provide a valuable natural laboratory for studying the composition and character of the oceanic crust and the mechanisms of their emplacement and preservation on land. A classic example is the Coast Range ophiolite of California, which is one of the most extensive ophiolite terranes in North America. This oceanic crust likely formed during the middle Jurassic Period, roughly 170 million years ago, in an extensional regime within either a back-arc or a forearc basin. It was later accreted to the continental margin of Laurasia.

Longitudinal sedimentary tapering of pre-orogenic sediments correlates strongly with curvature of the submarine frontal accretionary belt in the South China Sea margin, suggesting that pre-orogenic sediment thickness is the major control on the geometry of frontal structures. The preexisting South China Sea slope that lies obliquely in front of the advancing accretionary wedge has impeded the advancing of frontal folds resulting in a successive termination of folds against and along strike of the South China Sea slope. The existence of the South China Sea slope also leads the strike of impinging folds with NNW-trend to turn more sharply to a NE-strike, parallel to strike of the South China Sea slope. Analysis shows that the pre-orogenic mechanical/crustal heterogeneities and seafloor morphology exert strong controls on the thrust-belt development in the incipient Taiwan arc-continent collision zone.

In accretionary wedges, seismicity activating superimposed thrusts may drive methane and oil upraising from the upper crust.

Mechanical models that treat accretionary complexes as critically tapered wedges of sediment demonstrate that pore pressure controls their taper angle by modifying basal and internal shear strength. Results from some studies show that pore pressure in accretionary wedges can be viewed as a dynamically maintained response to factors which drive pore pressure (source terms) and those that limit flow (permeability and drainage path length). Sediment permeability and incoming sediment thickness are the most important factors, whereas fault permeability and the partitioning of sediment have a small effect. In one such study, it was found that as sediment permeability is increased, pore pressure decreases from near-lithostatic to hydrostatic values and allows stable taper angles to increase from ~2.5° to 8°–12.5°. With increased sediment thickness (from 100–8,000 m (330–26,250 ft)), increased pore pressure drives a decrease in stable taper angle from 8.4°–12.5° to <2.5–5°. In general, low-permeability and thick incoming sediment sustain high pore pressures consistent with shallowly tapered geometry, whereas high-permeability and thin incoming sediment should result in steep geometry. Active margins characterized by a significant proportion of fine-grained sediment within the incoming section, such as northern Antilles and eastern Nankai, exhibit thin taper angles, whereas those characterized by a higher proportion of sandy turbidites, such as Cascadia, Chile, and Mexico, have steep taper angles. Observations from active margins also indicate a strong trend of decreasing taper angle (from >15° to <4°) with increased sediment thickness (from <1 to 7 km).

Rapid tectonic loading of wet sediment in accretionary wedges is likely to cause the fluid pressure to rise until it is sufficient to cause dilatant fracturing. Dewatering of sediment that has been underthrust and accreted beneath the wedge can produce a large steady supply of such highly overpressured fluid. Dilatant fracturing will create escape routes, so the fluid pressure is likely to be buffered at the value required for the transition between shear and oblique tensile (dilatant) fracture, which is slightly in excess of the load pressure if the maximum compression is nearly horizontal. This in turn buffers the strength of the wedge at the cohesive strength, which is not pressure-dependent, and will not vary greatly throughout the wedge. Near the wedge front the strength is likely to be that of the cohesion on existing thrust faults in the wedge. The shear resistance on the base of the wedge will also be fairly constant and related to the cohesive strength of the weak sediment layer that acts as the basal detachment. These assumptions allow the application of a simple plastic continuum model, which successfully predicts the observed gently convex taper of accretionary wedges.

Pelayo and Weins have postulated that some tsunami events have resulted from rupture through the sedimentary rock along the basal decollement of an accretionary wedge.

Backthrusting of the rear of the accretionary wedge, arcward over the rocks of the forearc basin, is a common aspect of accretionary tectonics. An older assumption that backstops of accretionary wedges dip back toward the arc, and that accreted material is emplaced below such backstops, is contradicted by observations from many active forearcs that indicate (1) backthrusting is common, (2) forearc basins are nearly ubiquitous associates of accretionary wedges, and (3) forearc basement, where imaged, appears to diverge from the sedimentary package, dipping under the wedge while the overlying sediments are often lifted up against it. Backthrusting may be favored where relief is high between the crest of the wedge and the surface of the forearc basin because the relief must be supported by shear stress along the backthrust.

== Examples ==
=== Currently active wedges ===
- Mediterranean Ridge – part of the active collision zone between the African and Eurasian plates
- Barbados Ridge – the South American plate is subducting beneath Caribbean plate
- Nankai accretionary complex – the Philippine Sea plate is subducting beneath the Amurian microplate. In recent years, this is the site of attention for studying the temperature of subseafloor life and underground hot fluids in subducting zones.

=== Exhumed ancient wedges ===
- Chilean Coast Range between 38°S and 43°S (Bahía Mansa Metamorphic Complex).
- Calabrian Accretionary Wedge in the Central Mediterranean – The Neogene tectonics of the central Mediterranean are related to the subduction and trench rollback of the Ionian basin under Eurasia, causing the opening of the Liguro-Provençal and Tyrrhenian back-arc basins and the formation of the Calabrian accretionary wedge. The Calabrian accretionary wedge is a partially submerged accretionary complex located in the Ionian offshore and laterally bounded by the Apulia and Malta escarpments.
- The Olympic Mountains located in Washington State. The mountains began to form about 35 million years ago when the Juan de Fuca plate collided with and was forced (subducted) under the North American plate.
- Kodiak Shelf in the Gulf of Alaska – The geology of the Chugach National Forest is dominated by two major lithologic units, the Valdez Group (Late Cretaceous) and the Orca Group (Paleocene and Eocene). The Valdez Group is part of a 2,200-km-long by 100-km-wide belt of Mesozoic accretionary complex rocks called the Chugach terrane. This terrane extends along the Alaska coastal margin from Baranof Island in southeastern Alaska to Sanak Island in southwestern Alaska. The Orca Group is part of an accretionary complex of Paleogene age called the Prince William terrane that extends across Prince William Sound westward through the Kodiak Island area, underlying much of the continental shelf to the west
- Neogene accretionary wedge off Kenai Peninsula, Alaska – Subduction accretion and repeated terrane collision shaped the Alaskan convergent margin. The Yakutat Terrane is currently colliding with the continental margin below the central Gulf of Alaska. During the Neogene the terrane's western part was subducted after which a sediment wedge accreted along the northeast Aleutian Trench. This wedge incorporates sediment eroded from the continental margin and marine sediments carried into the subduction zone on the Pacific plate.
- The Franciscan Formation of California – Franciscan rocks in the Bay Area range in age from about 200 million to 80 million years old. The Franciscan Complex is composed of a complex amalgamation of semi-coherent blocks, called tectonostratigraphic terranes, that were episodically scraped from the subducting oceanic plate, thrust eastward, and shingled against the western margin of North America. This process formed a stacking sequence in which the structurally highest rocks (on the east) are the oldest, and in which each major thrust wedge to the west becomes younger. Within each of the terrane blocks, however, the rocks become younger upsection, but the sequence may be repeated multiple times by thrust faults.
- The Apennines in Italy are largely an accretionary wedge formed as a consequence of subduction. This region is tectonically and geologically complex, involving both subduction of the Adria micro-plate beneath the Apennines from east to west, continental collision between the Eurasia and Africa plates building the Alpine mountain belt further to the north and the opening of the Tyrrhenian basin to the west.
- Carpathian Flysch Belt in Bohemia, Slovakia, Poland, Ukraine and Romania represent Cretaceous to Neogene thin-skinned zone of Carpathian thrustbelt, which is thrust over the Bohemian Massif and East European Platform. Represents a continuation of Alpine Rhenodanubian Flysch of Penninic Unit.

== See also ==
- Subduction zone metamorphism
