= Geology of the Alps =

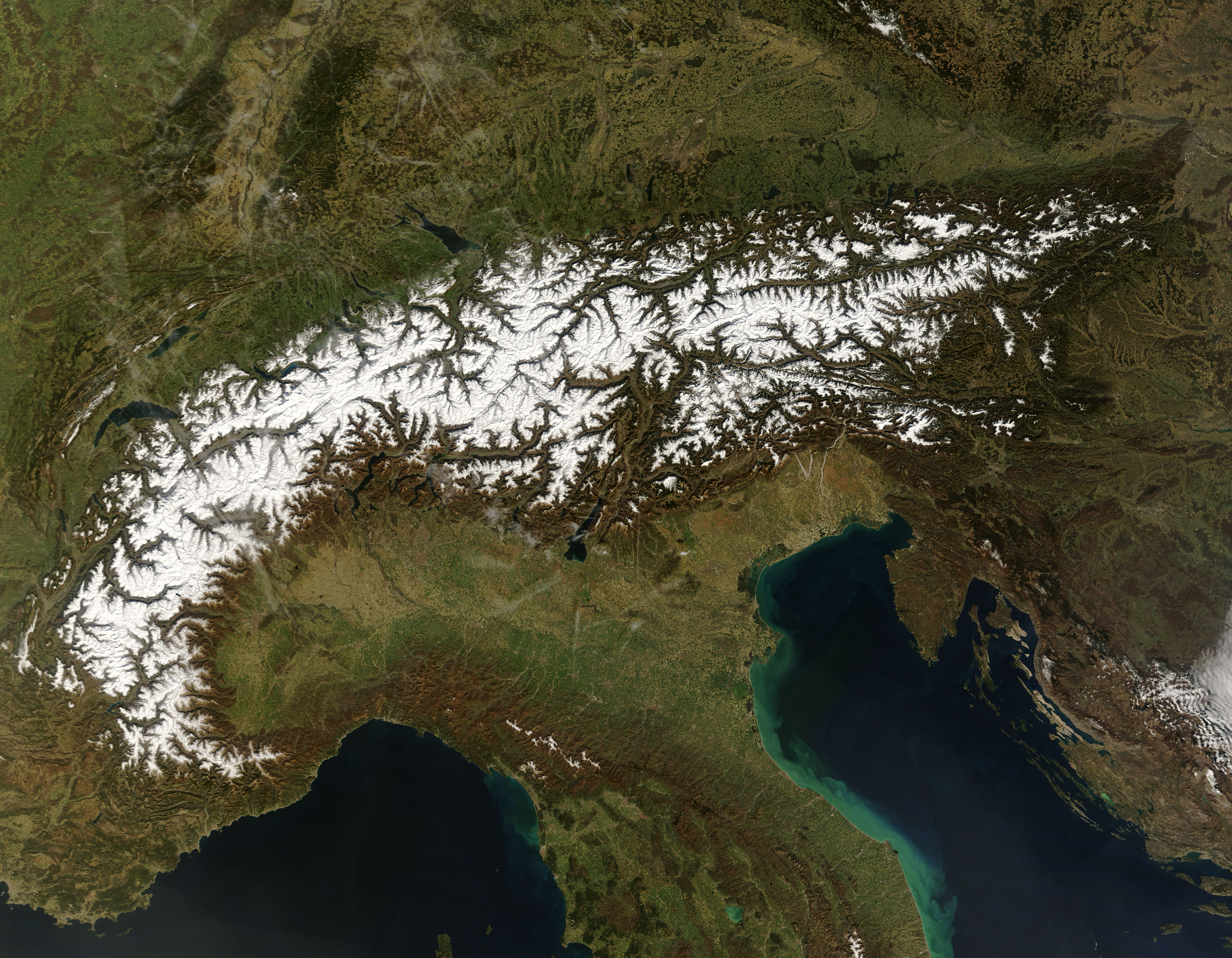
Satellite image of the Alps, March 2007

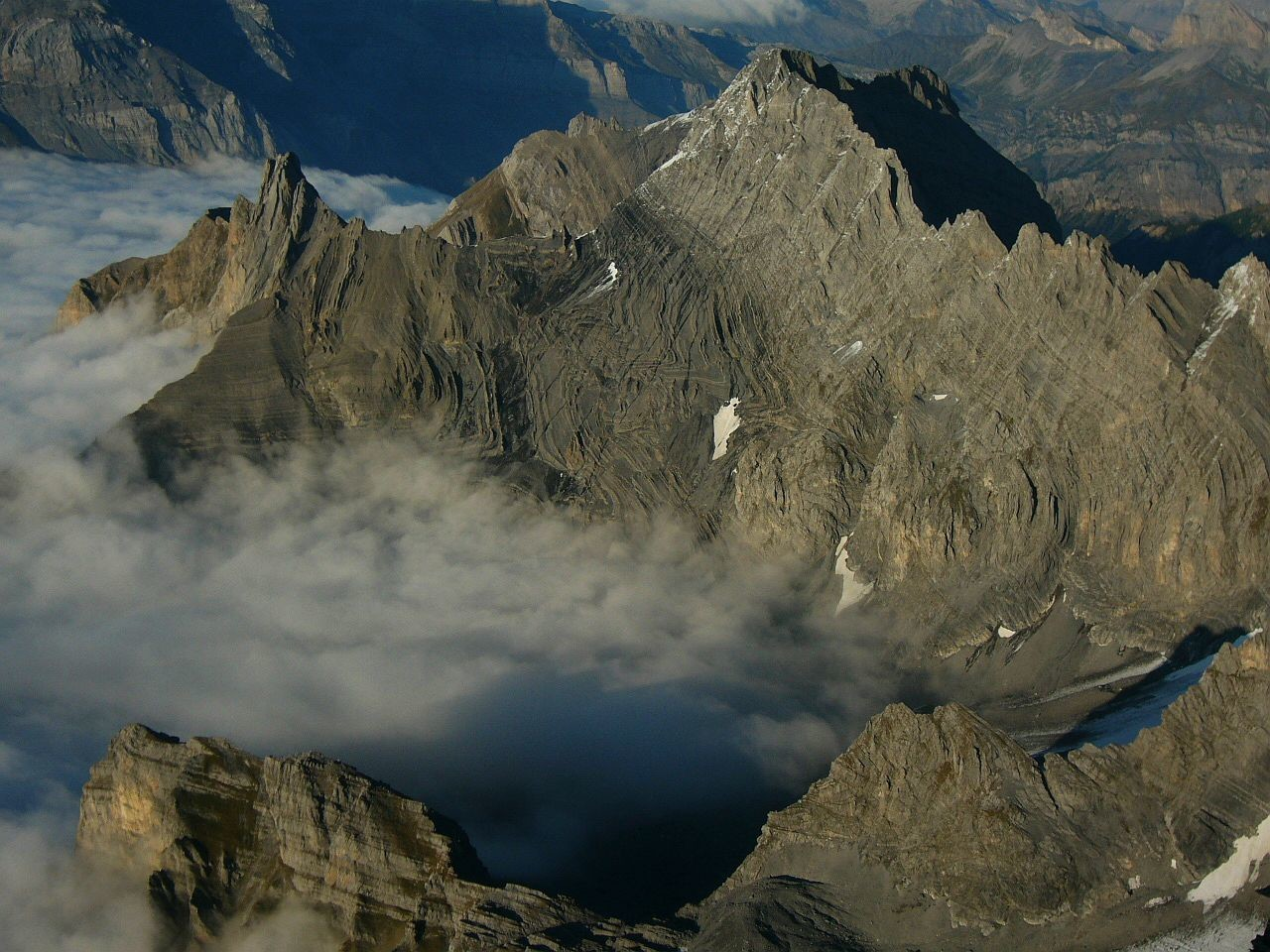
Folded rock layers exposed in the Swiss Alps

The Alps form part of a Cenozoic orogenic belt of mountain chains, called the Alpide belt, that stretches through southern Europe and Asia from the Atlantic all the way to the Himalayas. This belt of mountain chains was formed during the Alpine orogeny. A gap in these mountain chains in central Europe separates the Alps from the Carpathians to the east. Orogeny took place continuously and tectonic subsidence has produced the gaps in between.

The Alps arose as a result of the collision of the African and Eurasian tectonic plates, in which the Alpine Tethys, which was formerly in between these continents, disappeared. Enormous stress was exerted on sediments of the Alpine Tethys basin and its Mesozoic and early Cenozoic strata were pushed against the stable Eurasian landmass by the northward-moving African landmass. Most of this occurred during the Oligocene and Miocene epochs. The pressure formed great recumbent folds, or nappes, that rose out of what had been the Alpine Tethys and pushed northward, often breaking and sliding one over the other to form gigantic thrust faults. Crystalline basement rocks, which are exposed in the higher central regions, are the rocks forming Mont Blanc, the Matterhorn, and high peaks in the Pennine Alps and Hohe Tauern (Stampfli & Borel 2004).

Subsequently, the formation of the Mediterranean Sea covered terranes originating within the African plate south of the mountains.

== Geologic boundaries ==
Tectonic map of the Mediterranean, showing the position of the Alps within other structures of the Alpide belt

The Alps form a northward convex arc around their southeastern foreland basin, the Po river basin (to be precise the south is in fact their hinterland). Quaternary and Neogene sediments in this basin lie discordant over the southernmost thrust units. In the northeast, southward dipping and internally thrust Cenozoic foreland deposits (flysch and molasse) are found. This Bavarian and Swiss foreland basin is called the Molasse basin. The foreland basin deposits are overthrust from the south by the thrustfront of the Alpine nappes. In Switzerland the Molasse Basin is rimmed to the northwest by the Jura Mountains, an external fold-and-thrust belt, which can be seen as part of the Alps geologically. The western part of the Molasse basin forms the plateau of the Mittelland between the Alps and Jura Mountains. The Jura Mountains' location is still a topic for debate. A possible tectonic factor is the north–south extensional Upper Rhine Graben to the north.

The Alps continue fairly smoothly into the following related Alpine mountain ranges: the Apennines to the southwest, the Dinarides to the southeast and the Carpathians to the northeast. In the east the Alps are bounded by the Viennese Basin and the Pannonian Basin, where east–west stretching of the crust takes place.

== Geologic structure ==
The Alps have a complex geology, but the general structure is the same as for other mountain ranges formed by continental collision.

=== Subdivisions ===
The Alps are often divided into Eastern, Central and Western Alps, even though the boundaries between these subdivisions are arbitrary. The division between the Eastern and Central Alps is approximately the line between St. Margrethen, Chur and Sondrio; the division between the Central and Western Alps is unclear (Pfiffner 2009, p. 25). The main suture (big shear zone) in the Alps is called the Periadriatic Seam and runs through the Alps from east to west. This is the boundary between materials from the (former) European and Adriatic plate plates. South of this line are folded and thrust units of the Southern Alps.

North of the Periadriatic seam, rocks from three main palaeogeographic "domains" are found: the Helvetic or Dauphinois, the Penninic and the Austroalpine domains. This subdivision is made according to the paleogeographical origins of the rocks: the Helvetic zone contains material from the European plate, the Austroalpine zone material from the Adriatic plate, the Penninic zone material from the domains that existed in between the two plates.

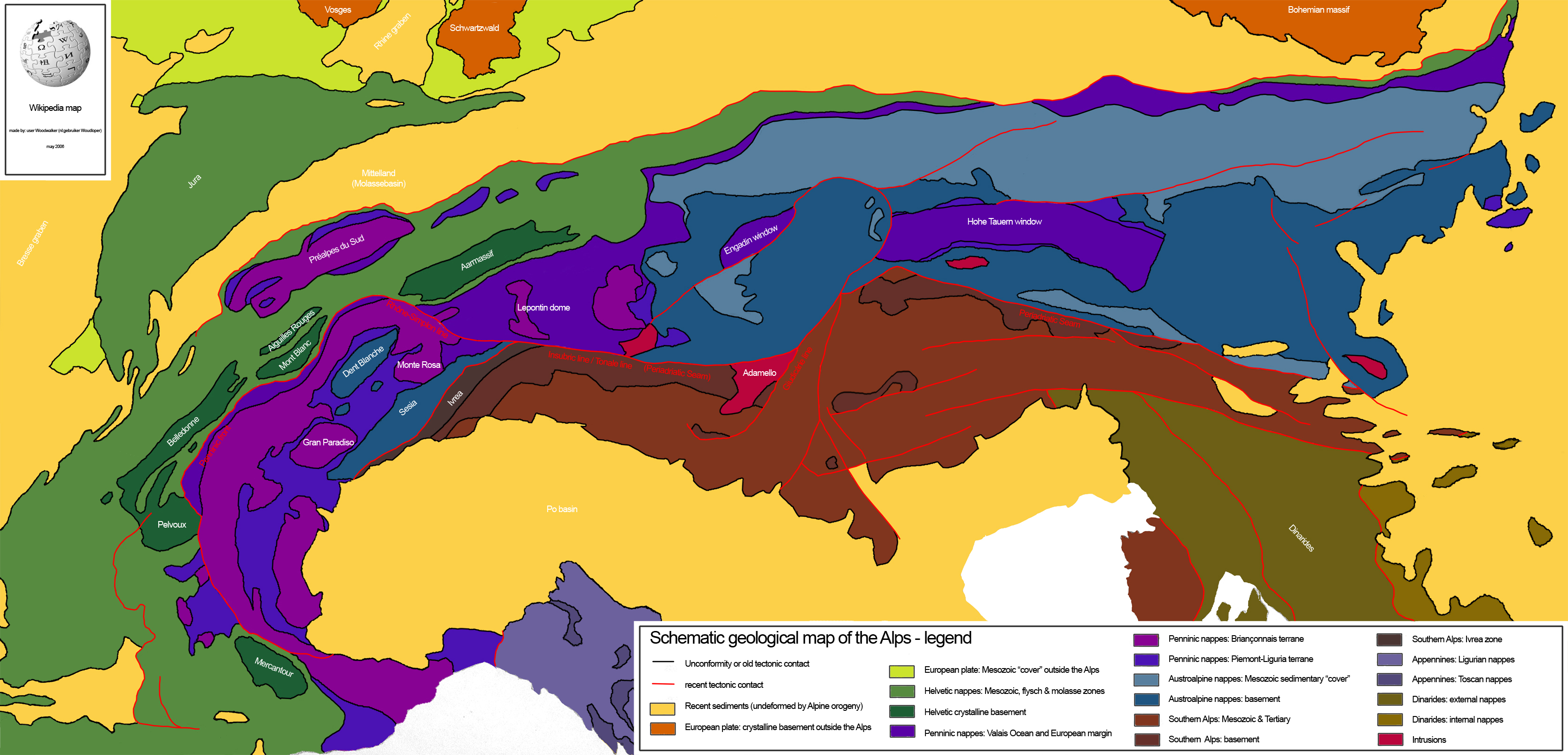
Simplified geological map of the Alps, showing the tectonic subdivision and the largest geological structures. Some details are based on controversial assumptions.

=== Structural geology ===
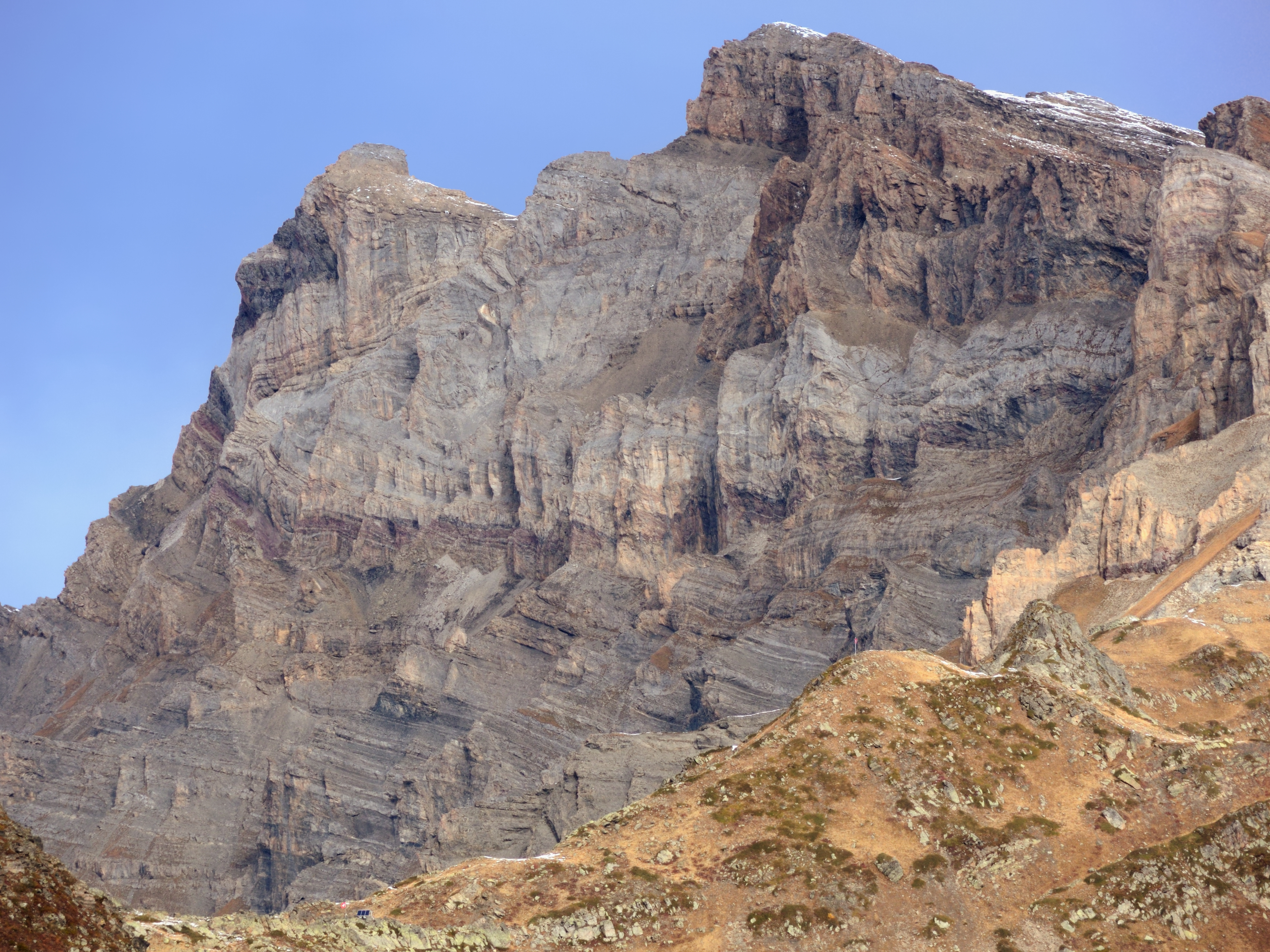
Folded Helvetic nappe rock layers at Dent de Morcles, Switzerland

Folds and thrusts north of the Periadriatic seam are generally directed to the north, the dominant vergence (direction of fold asymmetry) in these units is to the north. In the Southern Alps the thrusts are to the south so the vergence is dominantly southward.

The rocks of the Austroalpine nappes form most of the outcrops in the Eastern Alps, while in the west these nappes are, with the exception of a few places (the Dent Blanche and Sesia units), eroded away. In the Western Alps the Helvetic nappes can be found to the north and west, sometimes still under klippes of the Penninic nappes, as in the Préalpes du Sud south of Lake Geneva.

In many spots in the central zone north of the Periadriatic seam large antiforms called anticlinoria can be found, sometimes they are displayed in the outcrops as windows. At the level of one of these windows (the Hohe Tauern window) the Periadriatic seam curves to the north, which suggests that the Adriatic plate is more rigid in this particular spot, working as a so-called indentor. In the central part of Switzerland, uplift took place along a ductile north–south normal faultzone called the Rhône-Simplon line. The structure thus formed is called the Lepontin dome.

=== Intrusions ===
In older rocks from the lower crust intrusions are found that formed during or just after the Hercynian orogeny. These intrusions are older than the Alps and have nothing to do with their formation. Radiometric age determination yields ages around 320 Ma. Slightly younger felsic intrusions formed by Permian and Triassic extension can also be found.

Intrusions from the formation of the Alps themselves are relatively rare. The largest ones can be found along the Periadriatic seam, the largest one is the Adamello granite. In the Penninic nappes migmatites and small melts can be found.

=== Metamorphism ===
The rocks of the Helvetic and Austroalpine nappes and the southern Alps did not experience high grade metamorphism in the major Alpine phases in the Cenozoic. Any high grade metamorphic rocks in these units will not have become metamorphic due to the formation of the Alps. Other possibilities are:

- they were originally from lower regions of the crust and got to the surface by uplift, which gives them amphibolite facies at most.
- in the Austroalpine nappes eclogites occur that were formed during the Cretaceous period, in an early phase of mountain building called the Eo-Alpine orogeny. These are high-grade metamorphic rocks, but their metamorphism is unrelated to the (later) formation of the Alps.

Cenozoic eclogites do occur in the Penninic nappes, which contain material that has been through blueschist or eclogite facies. These nappes show a Barrovian field gradient. This type of metamorphism can only occur when a rock is in pressure–temperature conditions that normally occur in the Earth's mantle. This means the Penninic nappes consist of material that was subducted into the mantle and was later obducted onto the crust.

Alpine (Cenozoic) contact- or Buchan metamorphism is rare in the Alps, because intrusions are rare.

== Tectonic history ==
The Alps are a fold and thrust belt. Folding and thrusting is the expression of crustal shortening which is caused by the convergent movements of the European and Adriatic plates.

=== Breakup of Pangaea ===
At the end of the Carboniferous period (300 Ma), the Hercynian or Variscan orogeny, in which the supercontinent Pangaea formed from Gondwana and Laurasia, was ended. East of the terranes that now form the Alps was the Paleo-Tethys Ocean.

The effects of wind and water were able to chemically and mechanically erode destroy the Hercynic mountain ranges. In the Permian, the main deposits in Europe were sandstone and conglomerate, products of erosion in the Hercynic mountain range. At the same time, crustal extension took place because the mountain range was isostatically unstable (this is called orogenic collapse). Due to extension, basins formed along the axis of the mountain range and felsic volcanism occurred. This was the first phase of rifting between Europe and Africa. Due to the rising sealevel in the Triassic period, the eastern margin of Pangaea was flooded. Shallow shelf seas and epicontinental seas existed in which evaporites and limestones were deposited.

=== Jurassic ===
In the early Jurassic period (180 Ma), a narrow ocean began to form between the northern (North America and Eurasia) and southern (Africa and South America) parts of Pangaea. The oceanic crust that was formed in the process is known as the Piemont-Liguria Ocean. This ocean is generally regarded as a western extension of the Tethys Ocean. Although it was not really connected to it, a peninsular piece of continental crust of the African plate called the Adriatic plate lay in between the African and European plates and was involved in subdividing the Tethys and early Alps formation. Sometimes the names Alpine Tethys or Western Tethys Ocean are used to describe a number of small oceanic basins that formed southwest of the European plate, to distinguish them from the Neo-Tethys Ocean in the east. Because the Jurassic was a time with high sealevels, all these oceans were connected by shallow seas. On the continents, shallow sea deposits (limestones) were formed during the entire Mesozoic.

In the late Jurassic the microcontinent Iberia broke away from the European plate and the Valais Ocean was formed between the two plates. Both Piemont-Liguria and Valais Oceans were never large oceans such as today's Atlantic Ocean. What they might have been like is the opening below the Red Sea, continuing down through Africa, forming the Great Rift Valley. Eventually, a new ocean will cut through east Africa as the rift develops, dividing a large section of land from the main continent.

When at the end of the Jurassic the Adriatic plate began to move toward the European plate, oceanic trenches formed in the eastern Alps. In these, deep marine sediments were deposited, such as radiolarites and lutites.

=== Eo-Alpine phase in the Cretaceous ===
The divergent movement of the European and African plates was relatively short-lived. When the Atlantic Ocean formed between Africa and South America (about 100 Ma) Africa began moving northeast.

As a result of this process, the soft layers of ocean sediment in the Alpine Tethys Oceans were compressed and folded as they were slowly thrust upwards. Caught in the middle of the merging continents, the area of the Tethys Sea between Africa and Eurasia began to shrink as oceanic crust subducted beneath the Adriatic plate. The tremendous forces at work in the lower continental foundation caused the European base to bend downward into the hot mantle and soften. The southern (African) landmass then continued its northward movement over some 1,000 km (600 mi). The slow folding and pleating of the sediments as they rose up from the depths is believed to have initially formed a series of long east–west volcanic island arcs. Volcanic rocks produced in these island arcs are found among the ophiolites of the Penninic nappes.

In the late Cretaceous the first continental collision took place as the northern part of the Adriatic subplate collided with Europe. This is called the Eo-Alpine phase, and is sometimes regarded as the first phase of the formation of the Alps. The part of the Adriatic plate that was deformed in this phase is the material that would later form the Austroalpine nappes and the Southern Alps. In some fragments of the Piemont-Liguria Ocean now in the Penninic nappes an Eo-Alpine deformation phase can also be recognized.

Apart from the Eo-Alpine fold and thrust belt other regions were still in the marine domain during the Cretaceous. On the southern margins of the European continent shallow seas formed limestone deposits, that would later be (in the Alps) incorporated into the Helvetic nappes. At the same time sedimentation of anoxic clay took place in the deep-marine realms of the Piemont-Liguria and Valais Oceans. This clay would later become the Bündner slates from the Penninic nappes.

=== Paleocene and Eocene ===
When the Piemont-Liguria oceanic crust had completely subducted beneath the Adriatic plate in the Paleocene, the Briançonnais microcontinent, according to some a piece of the Iberian plate, arrived at the subduction zone. The Briançonnais microcontinent and Valais Ocean (with island arcs) subducted beneath the Adriatic plate. They stayed at around 70 km (45 mi) below the surface during the Eocene, reaching the eclogite facies and becoming intruded by migmatites. This material would later become the Penninic nappes, but a large part of the Briançonnais terrane subducted further into the mantle and was lost. Meanwhile, at the surface the upper crust of the Adriatic plate (the later Austroalpine nappes) was thrust over the European crust. This was the main collisional phase in the formation of the Alps.

=== Oligocene and Miocene ===
When the subducting slab broke off (known as slab breakoff, slab pull) and fell away, the subducted crust began moving up. This led to the uplift of the thickened continental crust which led, in the Miocene, to extension. In the case of the Alps, the extension could only take place in a west–east direction because the Adriatic plate was still converging from the south. An enormous thrustzone evolved that would later become the Periadriatic Seam. The zone also accommodated dextral shear that resulted from the west–east extension. With the exception of the allochthon Austroalpine material, this thrust evolved at the boundary of the Adriatic and European plates. The central zones of the Alps rose and were subsequently eroded. Tectonic windows and domes as the Hohe Tauern window were formed in this way.

Meanwhile, the thrust front of the Penninic and Austroalpine nappes moved on, pushing all material in its way northward. Due to this pressure a decollement developed over which thrusting took place. The thrust material would become the Helvetic nappes.

The Adriatic plate started rotating counterclockwise.

=== Quaternary ===
After subduction of oceanic crust of the European plate collision nearly completely stopped in the Western and Central Alps (See map Figure 2)., These parts are still uplifted up to 2.5 mm/year in some areas. It is thought it is mainly due to rebound after weight loss from melting ice caps after the last ice age, intensive erosion during glaciation and some processes in the lithosphere and mantle. The Adriatic plate, pushed by the African plate, still rotates counterclockwise around the axis near Ivrea in northwestern Italy and is subducted in Eastern Alps and causes tectonic uplift (thrust) there.

== Geomorphology ==
The formation of the Alpine landscape seen today is a recent development – only some two million years old. Since then, five known ice ages have done much to remodel the region. The tremendous glaciers that flowed out of the mountain valleys repeatedly covered all of the Swiss plain and shoved the topsoil into the low rolling hills seen today. They scooped out the lakes and rounded off the limestone hills along the northern border.

The last great glacier advance in the Alps ended some 10,000 years ago, leaving the large lake now known as Lake Neuchatel. The ice in this region reached some 1,000 m (0.6 mi) in depth and flowed out of the region behind Lake Geneva some 100 km (60 mi) to the South. Today large granite boulders are found scattered in the forests in the region. These were carried and pushed by the glaciers that filled this part of the western plain for some 80,000 years during the last ice age. From their composition it has been possible to determine the precise area from which they began their journey. As the last ice age ended, it is believed that the climate changed so rapidly that the glaciers retreated back into the mountains in only some 200 to 300 years time.

Besides leaving an Arctic-like wasteland of barren rock and gravel, the huge moraine of material that was dropped at the front of the glaciers blocked huge masses of melt water that poured onto the central plain during this period. A huge lake resulted, flooding the region to a depth of several hundred meters for many years. The old shoreline can be seen in some places along the low hills at the foot of the mountains – the hills actually being glacial side-moraines. As the Aare, which now drains western Switzerland into the Rhine, eventually opened the natural dam, the water levels in the plain fell to near the present levels .

In the last 150 years humans have changed the flow and levels of all the rivers and most of the extensive wetlands and small lakes have disappeared under the effects of farming and other development.

It has been proposed that the height of mountains in the Dauphiné Alps is limited by glacier erosion, an effect referred to as the glacial buzzsaw.

== Geologic research ==
The Alps were the first mountain system to be extensively studied by geologists, and many of the geologic terms associated with mountains and glaciers originated there. The term Alps has been applied to mountain systems around the world that exhibit similar traits.

=== Geophysics ===
In the 1980s and 1990s, a number of teams began mapping the structures in the lower crust by seismology. The result was a number of detailed geological cross-sections of the deep structures below the Alps. When seismic research is combined with insights from gravitational research and mantle tomography the subducting slab of the European plate can be mapped. Tomography also shows some older detached slabs deeper in the mantle.

== See also ==
- Andean orogeny
- Swiss Plateau
- Geology of the Jura Massif
