= Geography of the Alps =

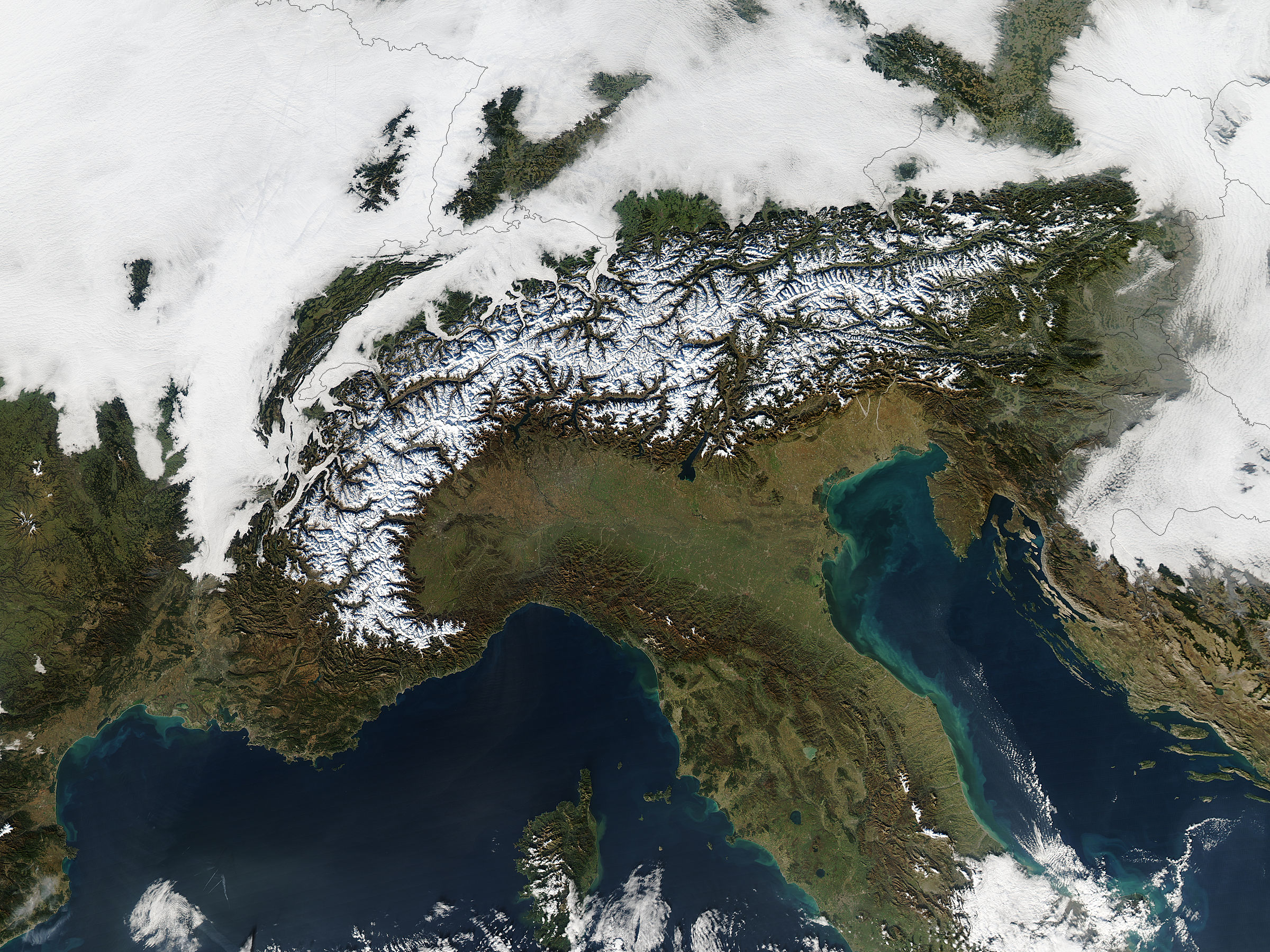
The Alps seen from space

The Alps form a large mountain range dominating Central Europe, including parts of Italy, France, Switzerland, Liechtenstein, Austria, Slovenia, Slovakia, Germany and Hungary.

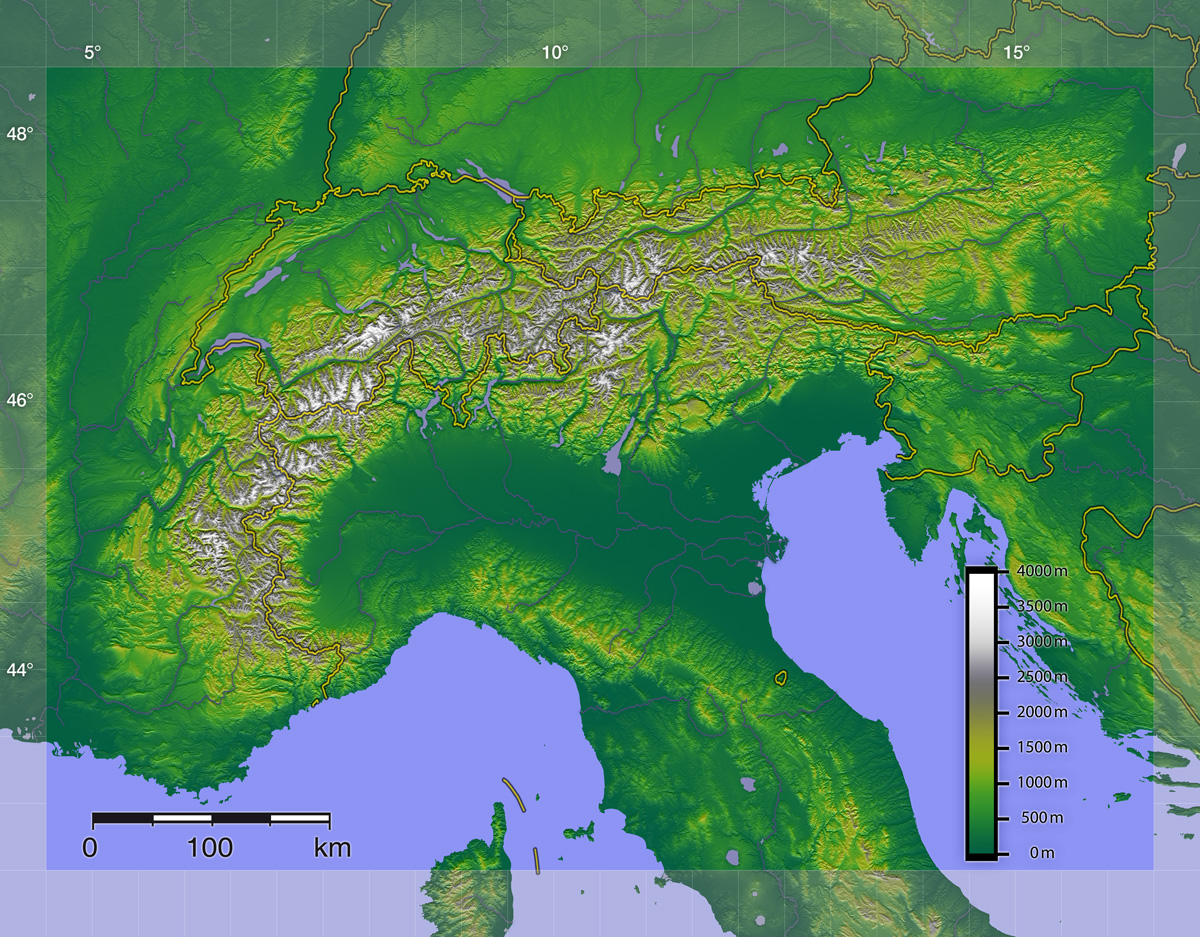
DEM-based shaded relief/hypsometric image of the Alps with the borders of the countries.

This article describes the delimitation of the Alps as a whole and of subdivisions of the range, follows the course of the main chain of the Alps and discusses the lakes and glaciers found in the region.

== Boundaries ==
In some areas, such as the edge of the Po Basin, the edge of the Alps is unambiguous, but where the Alps border on other mountainous or hilly regions, the border may be harder to place. These neighbouring ranges include the Apennines, the Massif Central, the Jura Mountains, the Black Forest, the Bohemian Forest, the Carpathian Mountains, and the mountains of the Balkan Peninsula.

The boundary between the Apennines and the Alps is usually taken to be the Colle di Cadibona, at 435 m above sea level, above Savona on the Italian coast.

The Rhône forms a clear boundary between the tectonically-formed Alps and the largely volcanically-formed Massif Central. Moving upstream, the Rhône turns to the east near Lyon, and passes to the south of the Jura range before reaching Lake Geneva. An area of flat ground reaches from there to Lake Neuchâtel, continuing the border, with the Jura to the north-west and the Alps to the south east. From Lake Neuchâtel to its confluence with the Rhine, the Aare forms the border.

The Black Forest is separated from the Alps by the Rhine and Lake Constance, but exact delimitation is difficult in southern Germany, where the land gently slopes up to meet the mountains (known in German as the Schwäbisch-Bayerisches Alpenvorland, the "Swabian-Bavarian pre-Alps").

In Austria, the Danube runs to the north of the Alps, separating it from the majority of the Bohemian Forest, although some small areas, such as the Dunkelsteiner Wald south of the Wachau, belong geologically to the Bohemian Forest despite being south of the Danube. The Vienna Woods near Vienna forms the north-eastern corner of the Alps, and here the Danube passes at its closest to the Alps (see Viennese Basin). East of Vienna, only the Marchfeld, a 30-km wide flood plain separates the easternmost Alps from the Lesser Carpathians. After Vienna, the Pannonian Basin, a large area of steppe, meets the edge of the Alps, clearly delimiting the eastern limit of the Alps.

The south-easternmost extension of the Alps is to be found in Slovenia, including Pohorje, the Kamnik Alps and the Julian Alps (the last being shared with Italy). The town of Idrija may be taken as marking the dividing line between the Alps to the north and the karst plateau to the south, which then leads on to the mountains of the Balkan Peninsula. The remainder of the southern edge of the Alps is clearly delimited by the basin of the Po.

This delimitation of the Alps is, however, largely subjective and open to argument. In particular, some people restrict the use of the term "Alps" to the higher mountains in the centre of the range, relegating the surrounding hills and mountains to the status of "pre-Alps" or foothills. This can sometimes lead to conflicting definitions, such as Mont Ventoux being considered to lie outside the Alps (there are no comparably sized mountains around it, and it is at a considerable distance from the main chain of the Alps).

It is not possible to define the Alps geologically, since the same orogenous events that created the Alps also created neighbouring ranges such as the Carpathians (see also geology of the Alps). The Alps are a distinct physiographic province of the larger Alpine System physiographic division, but the Alps are composed of three distinct physiographic sections, the Eastern, Western and Southern Alps.

== Subdivisions ==
While smaller groups within the Alps may be easily defined by the passes on either side, defining larger units can be problematic. A traditional divide exists between the Western Alps and the Eastern Alps, which uses the Splügen Pass (Italian: Passo dello Spluga) on the Swiss-Italian border, together with the Rhine to the north and Lake Como in the south as the defining features. While the Splügen Pass is neither the lowest nor the most important pass in the Alps, it is approximately halfway along the main chain, and makes a convenient boundary.

=== Eastern Alps ===
The Eastern Alps are commonly subdivided according to the different lithology (rock composition) of the more central parts of the Alps and the groups at its northern and southern fringes:

- Flysch zone (up from the Vienna Woods to the Bregenz Forest).
- Northern Limestone Alps, peaks up to 3000 m;
- Central Eastern Alps (Austria, Swiss), peaks up to 4050 m;
- Southern Limestone Alps, peaks up to 3500 m.

The border between the Central Eastern Alps and the Southern Limestone Alps is the Periadriatic Seam. The Northern Limestone Alps are separated from the Central Eastern Alps by the Grauwacken Zone.

However, the geologic subdivision, based on tectonics, suggests a different system:

- The Helvetic system in the north (including the Jura Mountains, which do not geographically belong to the Alps),
- the Penninic system: mainly Central Alps (Engadine and "Tauern window") and Flysch Alps,
- the Austroalpine system: Northern Limestone Alps, Graywacke-Schist zone, Central Crystalline,
- the Southern Alps (Southern Limestone Alps and other chains south of the Periadriatic Seam)
- south of a huge geologic fault ("alpine-dinaric seam") parts of the Dinarides.

=== Western Alps ===
The Western Alps are commonly subdivided into the following:

- Ligurian Alps (from Savona to Colle di Tenda)
- Maritime Alps (from Colle di Tenda to Colle della Maddalena)
- Cottian Alps (from Colle de la Maddalena to Montgenevre Pass)
- Dauphiné Alps (from Col du Mont Genevre to Col du Mont Cenis)
- Graian Alps (from Col du Mont Cenis to the Col Ferret)
- Chablais Alps (from Lake Geneva to the Col des Montets)
- Pennine Alps (from Col Ferret to the Simplon Pass)
- Lepontine Alps (from Simplon Pass to Splügen Pass)
- Bernese Alps (north of the Rhône to the Grimsel Pass)
- Urner Alps (from Grimsel Pass to the Reuss)
- Glarus Alps (north-east of Oberalp Pass)
- Appenzell Alps (north of Sargans)

Within the Eastern Alps, the most widely used subdivision is the Alpine Club's 1984 classification, which divides the region into about seventy small areas.

== Main chain ==
The "main chain of the Alps" follows the watershed from the Mediterranean to the Wienerwald, passing over many of the highest and most famous peaks in the Alps. The most important passes and peaks which it crosses are given below (mountains are indented, passes unindented). From the Colle di Cadibona to Col de Tende it runs westwards, before turning to the north-west and then, near the Colle de la Maddalena, to the north. Upon reaching the Swiss border, the line of the main chain heads approximately east-north-east, a heading it follows until its end near Vienna.

- Colle di Cadibona (Italy, 435 m)
- Colle di Tenda / Col de Tende (France / Italy, 1908 m)
- Colle della Maddalena / Col de Larche (France / Italy, 1994 m)
  - Monte Viso (France / Italy, 3841 m)
- Col de Montgenèvre (France / Italy, 1854 m)
- Col de Fréjus (France / Italy, 2537 m)
- Col du Mont Cenis (France, 2084 m)
  - Aiguille de la Grande Sassière (France / Italy, 3751 m)
- Little St Bernard Pass (France / Italy, 2188 m)
  - Mont Blanc / Monte Bianco (France / Italy, 4810.45 m, highest point in the Alps)
- Great St. Bernard Pass (Switzerland / Italy, 2469 m)
  - Matterhorn / Monte Cervino (Switzerland / Italy, 4478 m)
  - Monte Rosa (Switzerland / Italy, 4634 m)
- Simplon Pass (Switzerland, 2005 m)
  - Blinnenhorn (Switzerland / Italy, 3374 m)
- Saint Gotthard Pass (Switzerland, 2044 m)
  - Rheinwaldhorn (Switzerland, 3402 m)
- Splügen Pass / Passo dello Spluga (Switzerland / Italy, 2113 m)
- Maloja Pass (Switzerland, 1809 m)
  - Piz Bernina (Switzerland / Italy, 4049 m)
- Fuorn Pass (Switzerland, 2419 m)
  - Piz Sesvenna (Switzerland / Italy, 3205 m)
- Reschen Pass (Austria / Italy, 1504 m)
  - Weißkugel (Austria / Italy, 3738 m)
- Timmelsjoch / Passo del Rombo (Austria / Italy, 2491 m)
  - Zuckerhütl (Austria, 3507 m, highest point in the Stubaier Alpen)
- Brenner Pass (Austria / Italy, 1371 m)
  - Hochfeiler (Austria / Italy, 3509 m)
  - Großvenediger (Austria, 3666 m)
  - Großglockner (Austria, 3798 m, highest mountain in Austria)
- Hochtor (Austria, 2575 m)
  - Ankogel (Austria, 3246 m)
- Radstädter Tauern (Austria, 1739 m)
  - Hochgolling (Austria, 2863 m)
- Schober Pass (Austria, 849 m)
  - Hochschwab (Austria, 2277 m)
- Gerichtsberg (Austria, 581 m)
  - Schöpfl (Austria, 893 m, highest point in the Wienerwald)
- Danube, 160 m

Some of the highest peaks in the Alps, however, fall to one side or other of the main chain. These include:

- Barre des Écrins (France, 4102 m, highest point in the Dauphiné Alps)
- Gran Paradiso (Italy, 4061 m, highest point in the Graian Alps)
- Finsteraarhorn (Switzerland, 4274 m, highest point of the Berner Oberland)
- Jungfrau (Switzerland, 4158 m, Berner Oberland)
- Ortler / Cima Ortles (Italy, 3905 m)
- Marmolada (Italy, 3343 m, highest point in the Dolomites)
- Tödi (Switzerland, 3614 m, highest point of the Glarus Alps)
- Triglav (Slovenia, 2864 m, highest point in the Julian Alps).

For more detailed lists of passes, please see the articles about individual areas of the Alps.

== Glaciers ==
Several glaciers are located in the Alps, the longest of which is the aletsch Glacier in the Bernese Alps. They may be found in all of the higher groups of mountains from the Dauphiné Alps in France to the Hohe Tauern in central Austria, and the main ascent routes on many of the highest mountains pass over glaciers.

== Lakes ==
Very few large lakes are found within the body of the Alps, but a number are situated around the edge, particularly in areas formerly covered by glacier tongues. These include Lake Geneva on the northern side of the alps, on the French/Swiss border, Lago Maggiore, Lake Como and Lake Garda on the southern side of the Alps in Italy/Switzerland, and the lakes of Switzerland, southern Germany and the Austrian Salzkammergut in the north.

== Rivers ==
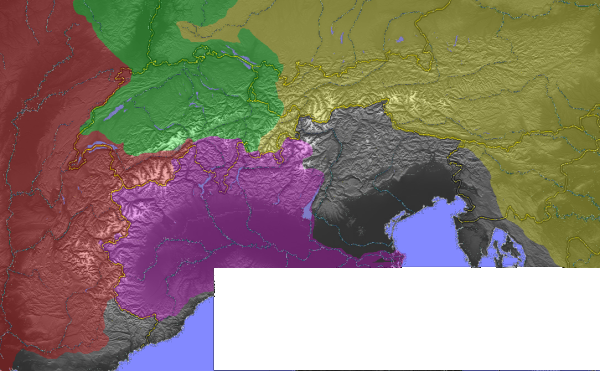

The main drainage basins of the Alps are those of the Rhine, the Rhone, the Danube and the Po. These have as main tributaries:

- Rhine: Aare, Reuss, posterior Rhine;
- Rhone: Durance, Drôme, Isère;
- Danube: Sava, Drava, Mur, Enns, Inn;
- Po: Oglio, Adda, Ticino, Dora Baltea.

Other important rivers draining the Alps include the Var, Adige and Piave.

The triple watershed Rhine-Rhone-Po is south of Furka Pass near the summit of the Witenwasserenstock, at 46°31′N 8°27′E; the triple watershed Rhine-Po-Danube is at Lunghin Pass, Grisons (46°25′N 9°39′E, 2645 m); the triple watershed Po-Danube-Adige is at the Swiss-Italian border, near the summit of Monte Forcola south of Val Müstair, at 46°34′N 10°22′E.

== See also ==
- List of national parks in the Alps
- High Alps
