= Lepontin dome =

The Lepontine dome or Lepontin dome is a region of tectonic uplift in the Swiss part of the Alps. It is located in the Lepontine Alps and Glarus Alps.

The Alps north of the Periadriatic Seam are usually divided into three large nappe complexes. From bottom to top these are the Helvetic, Penninic and Austroalpine nappes. East of the dome all three are found on top of each other. The same counts for the region west of the dome, if the Sesia unit is seen as part of the Austroalpine nappes. The dome itself however only shows Penninic and Helvetic (the boundary between the two is still disputed) rocks. Apparently the uplift of the dome caused the upper Austroalpine material to be totally eroded away.

The creation of the dome was caused by a phase of east-west directed extension in the Miocene that occurred throughout the Eastern and Central Alps. This extensional phase was probably a result of slab detachment in the upper mantle. Similar large extensional structures appear in more places in the Alps, examples are the Hohe Tauern window and the smaller Engadin and Rechnitz windows.

== See also ==
- Geology of the Alps
