= Tristel Formation =

Geologic formation of the northern-central Alps

- Stratigraphic range: Late Barremian-Early Aptian; ~127–123 Ma
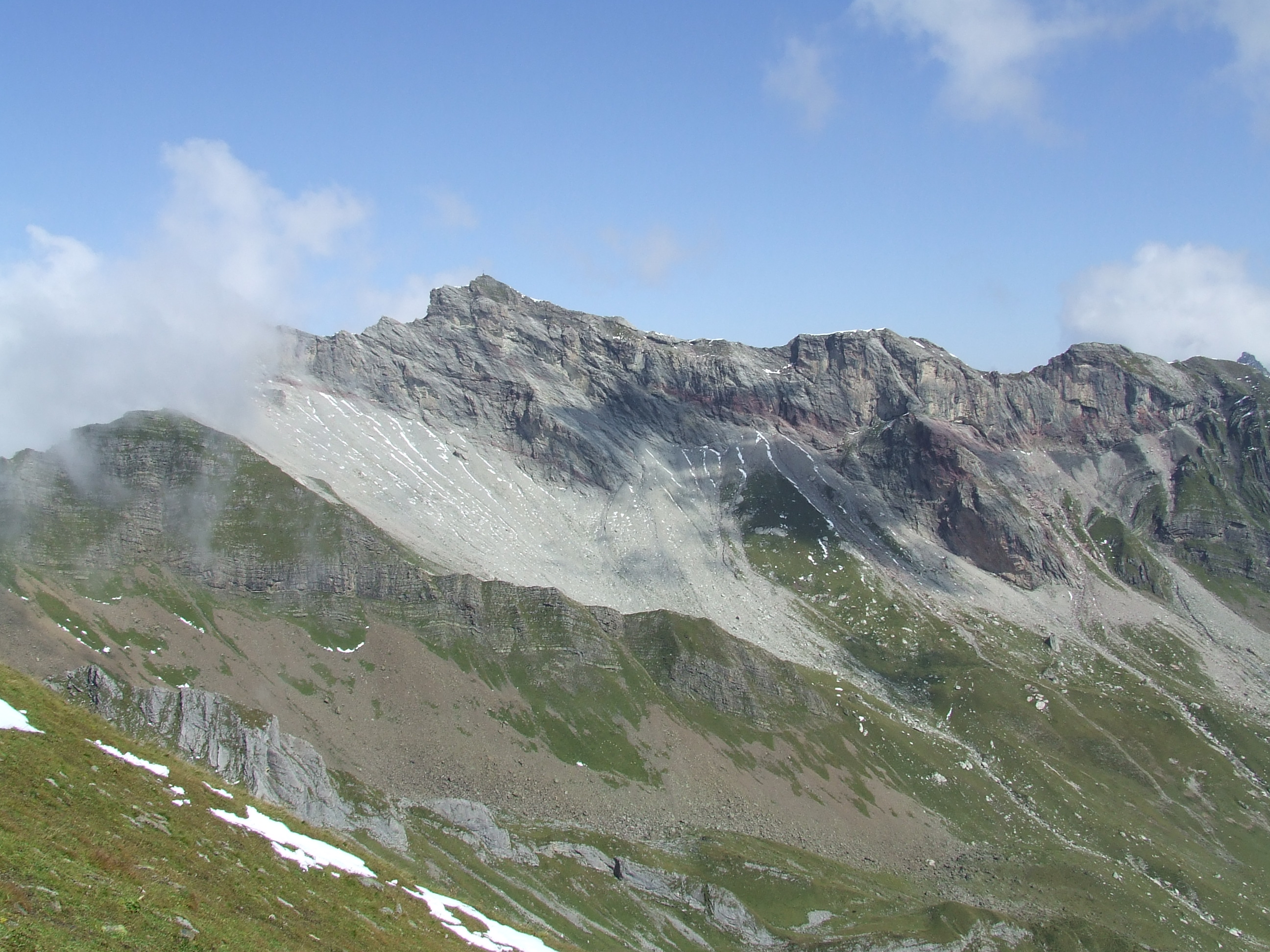
- Tristel Formation near its type locality, looking at Naafkopf from the southwest
- Type: Geological formation
- Unit of: Rhenodanubic Group, Bündnerschiefer
- Thickness: 150–250 m (490–820 ft)

Lithology
- Primary: Limestone, marl
- Other: Shale

Location
- Coordinates: 47.060767°N 9.607067°E
- Region: Allgäu, Oberbayern, Tirol, Vorarlberg
- Country: Austria, Germany, Liechtenstein, Switzerland

Type section
- Named for: Tristel, a mountain next to the Naafkopf
- Named by: Schwizer
- Year defined: 1984

The Tristel Formation is a stratigraphic formation of the northern-central Alps, deposited between the late Barremian and the early Aptian of the Early Cretaceous. It consists of thickly banked limestones, marls and shales. It is the lowest formation of the Bündnerschiefer and belongs to the Rhenodanubic Group.

Outcrops can be found in the Engadin window, the Tauern window, the Rechnitz window, and many localities of the Penninic realm of the eastern and western Alps.

The type locality is the area around the Naafkopf (47.060767°N 9.607067°E) in the border region of Austria, Liechtenstein and Switzerland.

The Tristel Formation can be correlated with the Klus Formation in Graubünden and the Couches de l’Aroley Formation in Savoie (France) and Valais (Switzerland).
