= Valais Ocean =

Subducted ocean basin. Remnants found in the Alps in the North Penninic nappes.

The Valais Ocean is a subducted oceanic basin which was situated between the continent Europe and the microcontinent Iberia or so called Briançonnais microcontinent. Remnants of the Valais ocean are found in the western Alps and in tectonic windows of the eastern Alps and are mapped as the so-called "north Penninic" nappes.

== Tectonic history ==
After the breakup of Pangaea in the early Mesozoic age, the continents of Africa, South America, Europe, and North America began to move away from each other. The breaking up, or rifting, did not take place along one unbroken line; thus, at the southern edge of the European plate, the microcontinent Iberia also began to break away from Europe. In the western part of the rift that separated the two landmasses, oceanic crust was formed in what is at present the Gulf of Biscay, while in the eastern part, the Valais Ocean was formed.

When, in the Cretaceous period, Africa again began to move towards Europe, the Valais Ocean became sandwiched between the two continents. To the east, the Valais oceanic crust, together with a piece of Iberian continental crust (called the Briançonnais terrane), subducted beneath the Apulian plate, a part of the African tectonic plate that had begun to move independently. This process eventually led to the formation of the Alps. To the west, no subduction took place, but the Iberian plate moved against the European plate along a large transform fault, which led to the formation of the Pyrenees.

Fragments of Valais oceanic crust have been obducted and can be found as ophiolites in the Penninic nappes of the Alps.

== Name ==
The Valais Ocean was named after the Swiss canton Valais.

== Occurrences ==
In the eastern Alps remnants of the Valais are confined to tectonic windows and the northern margin of the Alps. They include oceanic sediments (e.g. radiolarites, turbidites) and oceanic crust (e.g. basalt, pillow lava). The windows in the overlying Austroalpine nappes reveal the underlying Penninic nappes. In the Engadin window, remnants are found in the Pfundser zone and in the Tauern window the "Obere Schieferhülle"; at the northern margin of the Alps the remnants are called Rhenodanubic flysch.

In the western Alps, remnants of the Valais crop out in many areas of Switzerland and France. This includes the Cheval noir unit, the Versoyen unit, the Sion-Courmayeur Zone, the Niesen nappe, the Schlieren flysch, the Antrona unit, the Wägital flysch and the Prätigau Bündnerschiefer.

== See also ==
- Piemont-Liguria Ocean
- Pannonian Sea
