= Central Eastern Alps =

Portion of the Eastern Alps mountain range

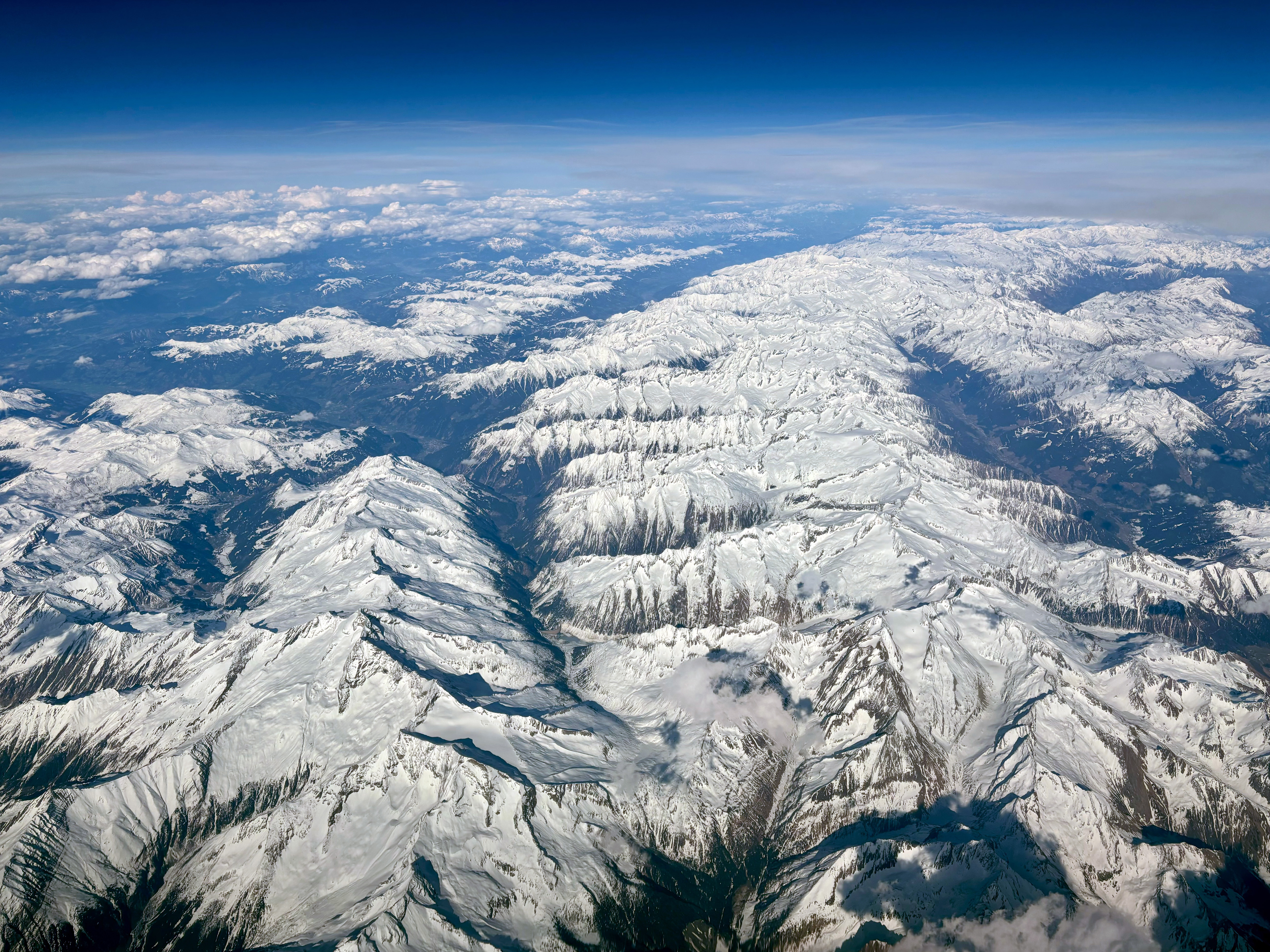
- Aerial view of Zillertal Alps

Highest point
- Peak: Piz Bernina
- Elevation: 4,049 m (13,284 ft)
- Coordinates: 46°22′57″N 9°54′29″E

Geography
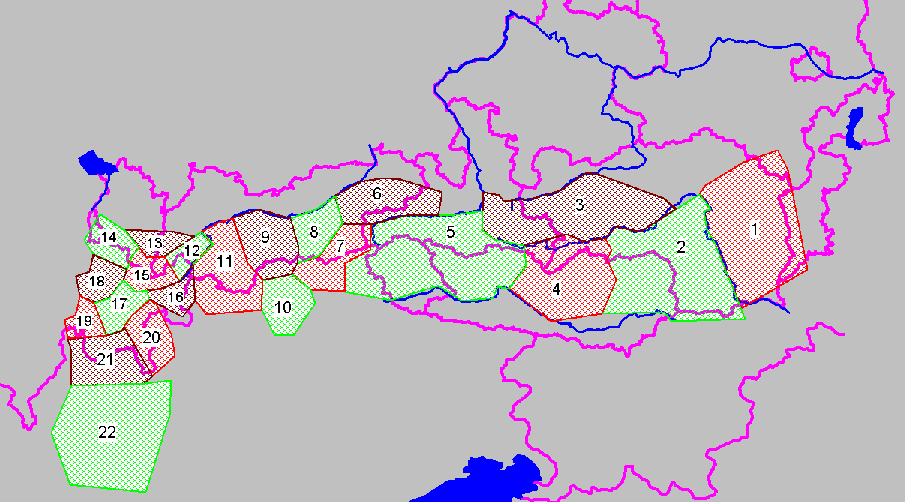
- Central Eastern Alps ranges (purple lines showing international borders and borders of Austrian states): Prealps East of the Mur (1); Lavanttal Alps (2); Low Tauern (3); Gurktal Alps (4); High Tauern (5); Kitzbühel Alps (6); Zillertal Alps (7); Tux Alps (8); Stubai Alps (9); Sarntal Alps (10); Ötztal Alps (11); Samnaun Alps (12); Verwall Alps (13); Rätikon (14); Silvretta Alps (15); Sesvenna (16); Albula Alps (17); Plessur Alps (18); Oberhalbstein Alps (19); Livigno Alps (20); Bernina (21); Bergamo Alps (22)
- Countries: Austria; Switzerland; Liechtenstein; Italy; Slovenia
- States: Vorarlberg; Tyrol; Salzburg; Carinthia; Styria; Graubünden; South Tyrol; Lombardy
- Parent range: Eastern Alps

Geology
- Orogeny: Alpine
- Rock ages: Mesozoic; Tertiary
- Rock types: Gneiss; Slate

The Central Eastern Alps (German: Zentralalpen or Zentrale Ostalpen), also referred to as Austrian Central Alps (German: Österreichische Zentralalpen) or just Central Alps, comprise the main chain of the Eastern Alps in Austria and the adjacent regions of Switzerland, Liechtenstein, Italy and Slovenia. South of them is the Southern Limestone Alps.

The term "Central Alps" is very common in the Geography of Austria as one of the seven major landscape regions of the country. "Central Eastern Alps" is usually used in connection with the Alpine Club classification of the Eastern Alps (Alpenvereinseinteilung, AVE). The Central Alps form the eastern part of the Alpine divide, its central chain of mountains, as well as those ranges that extend or accompany it to the north and south.

The highest mountain in the Austrian Central Alps is Grossglockner at 3,798 metres (12,461 ft).

== Location ==
The Central Alps have the highest peaks of the Eastern Alps, and are located between the Northern Limestone Alps and the Southern Limestone Alps, from which they differ in geological composition.

The term "Central Eastern Alps" may also be used more broadly to refer to a larger area of the Eastern Alps, mainly located in Austria, extending from the foot of the Bergamasque Alps at Lake Como and the Bernina Range in the Graubünden canton of eastern Switzerland along the Liechtenstein shore of the Rhine in the west as far as to the lower promontories east of the river Mur including the Hochwechsel in Austrian Styria. The valleys of the rivers Inn, Salzach and Enns mark their northern boundary, the Drau river (roughly corresponding to the Periadriatic Seam) their southern border. In the proposed SOIUSA system, the "Central-eastern Alps" include the Rhaetian Alps, of which the Bernina Range includes the 4,049-meter Piz Bernina in Switzerland, the easternmost 4,000-meter peak of the Alps. In the AVE system, however, the full list of mountain groups in the Alpine Club classification of the Eastern Alps includes the Bernina and neighboring ranges within the Western Limestone Alps, not the Central Eastern Alps as the Alpine Club defines them.

== Central Alps as a major landscape region in Austria ==
In Austria, the Eastern Alps are divided into the Northern Alps, the Greywacke zone, the Central Alps and the Southern Alps. The latter lie partly in South Carinthia, but mainly in Northeast Italy.

The Central and Northern Alps are separated by the Northern Longitudinal Trough (nördliche Längstalfurche), the line Klostertal–Arlberg–Inn Valley–Salzach Valley as far as Lake Zell–Wagrain Heights–Upper Enns Valley–Schober Pass–Mürz Valley Alps–Semmering–southern Vienna Basin. The Central Alps and Southern Alps are separated from one another by the Southern Longitudinal Valley (südlichen Längstalzug) Puster Valley (Rienz Valle–Toblach Field–upper Drava (Drau) Valley)–Drava Valley–Klagenfurt Basin–Meža (Mieß), or the Periadriatic Seam, which is not entirely identical with the Southern Longitudinal Trough.

== Geomorphology ==
The range has the highest summits in the Eastern Alps and is the most glaciated. In the transition zone between the East and West Alps, its peaks clearly dominate the region to the west (Piz d'Err, Piz Roseg). On the perimeter, however, there are also less high, often less rugged mountain chains, like the Gurktal Alps and the eastern foothills.

The Eastern Alps is separated from the Western Alps by a line from Lake Constance to Lake Como along the Alpine Rhine valley and via the Splügen Pass.

== Geology ==
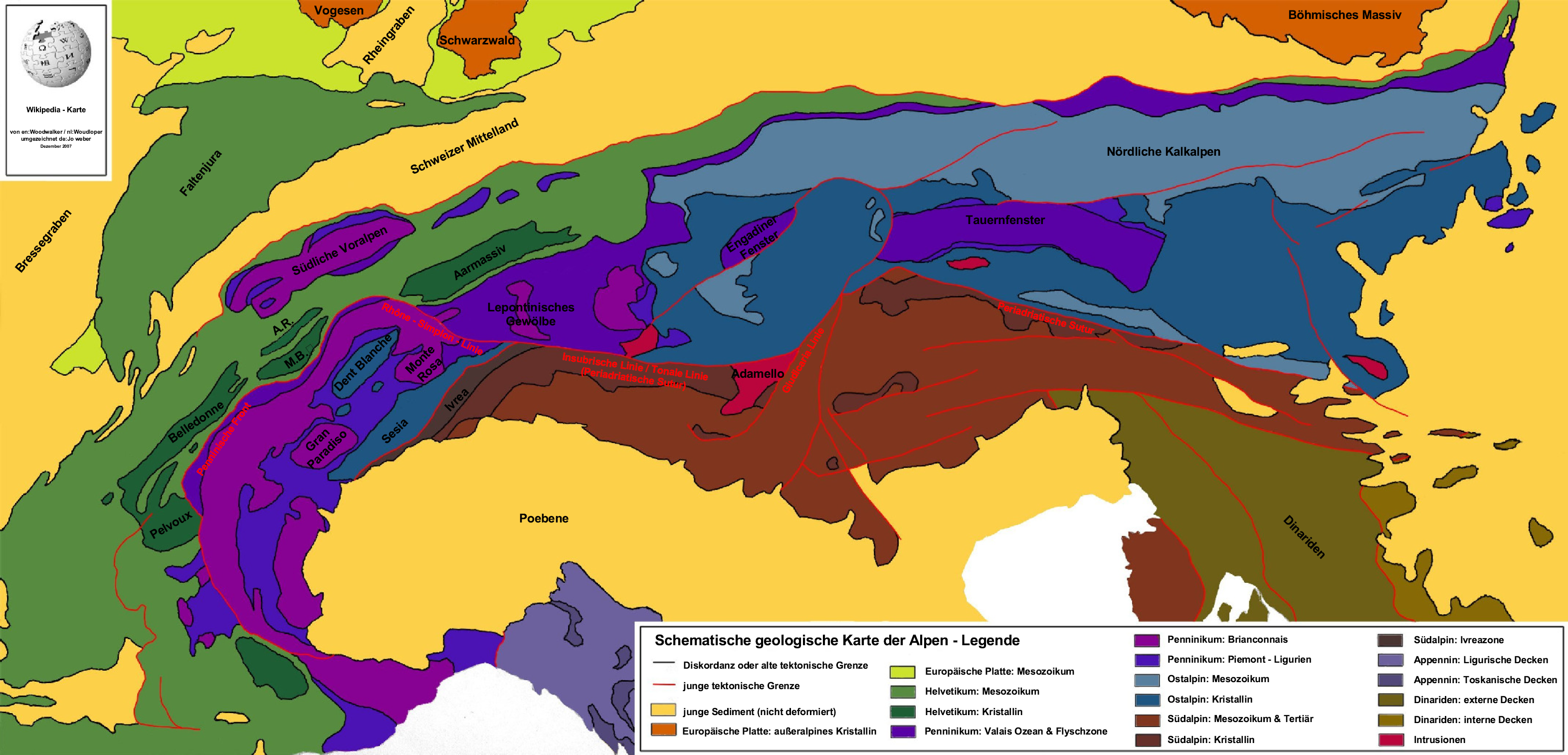
Geological makeup of the Alps: The Central Alps are formed from the crystalline East Alpine and several windows, regional nappes and islands

The Central Alps consist mainly of the gneiss and slate rocks of the various Austroalpine nappes (Lower and Upper Austroalpine), with the exception of the Hohe Tauern and Engadine windows, where they are composed mostly of Jurassic rock and limestones and, locally, (Bergell and Rieserferner) also of granite. The Austroalpine nappes are thrust over the Penninic nappe stack. Massifs of autochthonous, crystalline rock, which hardly moved at all during Alpine folding, do not occur in the Central Alps – unlike the case in the Western Alps. The aforementioned granite intruded near the fracture zone of the Periadriatic Seam. The Western Alps do not have this division into the Northern Limestone Alps, Central Alps and Southern Limestone Alps.

The Austroalpine submerges itself at the eastern edge of the Alps under the Tertiary sediments of the Alpine Foreland in the east and the Pannonian Basin. This fracture zone exhibits active volcanism (e.g. in the Styrian thermal region).

== Alpine Club classification ==
AVE- No.	Name	Map	Country	Highest mountain	Height (m)	Image
25	Rätikon		Switzerland; Austria; Liechtenstein	Schesaplana	2,964	Schesaplana (2,964 m)
26	Silvretta Alps		Switzerland; Austria	Piz Linard	3,411	Piz Linard (3,411 m)
27	Samnaun Alps		Austria; Switzerland	Muttler	3,294	The Muttler
28	Verwall Alps		Austria	Hoher Riffler	3,168	Hoher Riffler (3,168 m)
29	Sesvenna Alps		Switzerland; Italy; Austria	Piz Sesvenna	3,204	Piz Sesvenna (3,204 m)
30	Ötztal Alps		Austria; Italy	Wildspitze	3,768	Wildspitze (3,768 m)
31	Stubai Alps		Austria; Italy	Zuckerhütl	3,507	Zuckerhütl (3,507 m)
32	Sarntal Alps		Italy	Hirzer	2,781	Hirzer (2,781 m, links)
33	Tux Alps		Austria	Lizumer Reckner	2,884	Lizumer Reckner (2,884 m)
34	Kitzbühel Alps (Note: The Kitzbühel Alps and the adjacent Salzburg Slate Alps as part of the Greywacke zone are either counted as part of the Northern Limestone Alps or the Central Alps – geologically they form the bedrock of the Limestone Alps, and the slip zone, on which the latter were thrust northwards)		Austria	Kreuzjoch	2,558	Kreuzjoch (2,558 m)
35	Zillertal Alps		Austria	Hochfeiler	3,510	Hochfeiler (3,510 m)
36	Venediger Group		Austria	Großvenediger	3,666	Großvenediger (3,666 m)
37	Rieserferner Group		Italy; Austria	Hochgall	3,436	Hochgall (3,436 m)
38	Villgraten Mountains		Austria; Italy	Weiße Spitze	2,962	Weiße Spitze (2,962 m, links)
39	Granatspitze Group		Austria	Großer Muntanitz	3,232	Großer Muntanitz (3,232 m)
40	Glockner Group		Austria	Großglockner	3,798	Großglockner (3,798 m)
41	Schober Group		Austria	Petzeck	3,283	Petzeck (3,283 m)
42	Goldberg Group		Austria	Hocharn	3,254	Hocharn (3,254 m)
43	Kreuzeck Group		Austria	Mölltaler Polinik	2,784	Mölltaler Polinik (2,784 m)
44	Ankogel Group		Austria	Hochalmspitze	3,360	Hochalmspitze (3,360 m)
45a	Radstadt Tauern		Austria	Weißeck	2,711	Weißeck (2,711 m)
45b	Schladming Tauern		Austria	Hochgolling	2,862	Hochgolling (2,862 m)
45c	Rottenmann and Wölz Tauern		Austria	Rettlkirchspitze	2,475	Rettlkirchspitze (2,475 m)
45d	Seckau Tauern		Austria	Geierhaupt	2,417	Geierhaupt (2,417 m)
46a	Gurktal Alps		Austria	Eisenhut	2,441	Schwarzsee with Eisenhut (2,441 m) in the background
46b	Lavanttal Alps		Austria; Slovenia	Zirbitzkogel	2,396	Zirbitzkogel (2,396 m)
47	Prealps East of the Mur		Austria	Stuhleck	1,782	Summit cross on the Stuhleck (1,782 m)

The Central Eastern Alps also comprise the following ranges of the West Eastern Alps according to AVE classification, which geologically belong to the Southern Alps and are also subsumed under the Western Limestone Alps division.:

AVE- No.	Name	Map	Country	Highest mountain	Height (m)	Image
63	Plessur Alps		Switzerland	Aroser Rothorn	2,980	Aroser Rothorn (2,980 m)
64	Oberhalbstein Alps		Switzerland; Italy	Piz Platta	3,392	Piz Platta (3,392 m)
65	Albula Alps		Switzerland	Piz Kesch	3,418	Piz Kesch (3,418 m)
66	Bernina Group		Italy; Switzerland	Piz Bernina	4,049	Piz Bernina (4,049 m)
67	Livigno Alps		Italy; Switzerland	Cima de’ Piazzi	3,439	Cima de’ Piazzi (3,439 m)
68	Bergamasque Alps (Note: The Bergamasque Alps are – geologically and petrologically – part of the Southern Limestone Alps, and thus the Southern Alps)		Italy	Pizzo di Coca	3,052	Pizzo di Coca (3,052 m)

The Ortler Alps as well as the Sobretta-Gavia Group are also sometimes classified with the Central Alps, because they lie north of the geological fault of the Periadriatic Seam; in a general regional geographic sense, however, they are seen as part of the Southern Limestone Alps, because they are found south of the longitudinal trough Veltlin (Adda)–Vintschgau (Etsch). Also in terms of rock, the Ortler main crest is part of the Southern Limestone Alps.

== See also ==
- Geography of the Alps
