= Rhône-Simplon line =

Fault zone in the Swiss Alps

The Rhone-Simplon line is a large geologic faultzone in the Swiss Alps.

The line runs from the Ossola valley over the Simplon Pass and then follows the Rhône valley in an east–west direction. Somewhere south of Sion it goes over smoothly into the Penninic thrustfront.

Geologically speaking, the line serves as a huge dextral strike-slip fault. The northeastern block (called the Lepontin dome) is moving up as well. Geologists see the line as an expression of the continued NNW movement of the Apulian Plate into the Eurasian Plate.
