= Sesia zone =

The Sesia unit or Sesia nappe, also called the Sesia-Dent Blanche unit is a tectonic unit or terrane in the Swiss and Italian Alps. The zone crops out in the Pennine Alps and in the southeastern part of the Aosta Valley. It is widely seen as part of the Austroalpine nappes and correlated with the Dent Blanche nappe that crops out further to the northwest.

== Structural geology and lithology ==
The outcrop in the southern part of the Aosta Valley is bounded to the south by the Insubric line. On the other side of this steeply dipping fault zone is the Ivrea zone, which is geologically part of the Southern Alps. The Sesia zone is (just as the correlated Dent Blanche nappe) tectonostratigraphically on top of (ophiolitic) Zermatt-Saas zone of the Penninic nappes.

The Sesia zone has a penetrative foliation because it has seen a large amount of shear during exhumation. It is therefore hard to reconstruct any older structures. It can however structurally be divided in three parts: an external, an intermediate and an internal zone. The internal zone is structurally the highest unit and is next to the Insubric line.

== Metamorphism ==
The unit shows traces of high-grade metamorphism in the form of eclogite and blueschist relicts. Most of it, especially the external and intermediate zones, is in the greenschist facies though. This greenschist metamorphic grade is seen as a late (Meso-Alpine) overprint, most researchers think the whole Sesia zone or at least part of it has been in eclogite or blueschist conditions during Paleogene subduction. Because clear evidence for high pressure metamorphism is restricted to the internal zone, it is not clear whether the other two zones have also subducted to great depth.

== Paleogeography ==
The Sesia zone is, like the rest of the Austroalpine nappes, considered to have been a northern piece of the microcontinent Apulia or a semi-independent microcontinent that was situated just north of Apulia. When the continents Europe and Africa were divided by a rift zone in the Jurassic period, Apulia and the Austroalpine are supposed to have rifted apart from Africa (just like for example the present day British Isles, which are separated from the rest of Europe by the North Sea basin). When the plates converged again in the Paleogene, many small pieces of continental crust, like the Austroalpine microcontinent, became incorporated in the nappe stacks of the Alps.
