= Zermatt-Saas zone =

Tectonic unit in the western Alps

The Zermatt-Saas zone is a tectonic unit in the western part of the Alps. Its lithology is mainly ophiolite but there are some pelitic zones too.

The Zermatt-Saas zone is tectonostratigraphically the highest part of the Penninic nappes and lies directly under the Sesia zone and Dent Blanche klippe, that are interpreted as belonging to the Austroalpine nappes. It lies on top of other Penninic nappes, as the Monte Rosa nappe or the Combin zone.

The ophiolites of the Zermatt-Saas zone are mostly ultramafic rocks with greenschist facies mineralogy: serpentinites. Some mafic parts exist, they also have greenschist assemblages of actinolite, plagioclase and sometimes epidote or clinozoisite. However, relicts are found of blueschist and eclogite facies metamorphism during the Eocene, which shows that the current greenschist assemblage of the Zermatt-Saas zone is a retrograde overprint.
