= Fei Tang Precht =

Fei Tang Precht is an architect who co-founded Studio Precht alongside her husband Chris Precht.

== Early life and education ==
Fei Tang Precht was born in China and her grandfather was a bamboo craftsman.

She completed her master's degree from the University of Applied Arts Vienna.

== Career ==
In 2013, Fei Precht established Penda, a firm located in Beijing, China alongside her partner Chris Precht and Dayong Sun. After four years at Penda, Fei and Chris decided to relocate and downsize with a new practice, Studio Precht in 2017. Studio Precht is located in the Austrian Alps and is a small firm with only 6 people. The firm is known for pioneering new construction techniques using vernacular materials and its dramatic use of wood for sustainable projects that connect people back to nature.

== Projects ==
Bert - A tiny home tree house for Baumbaum. This concept was created by Fei Precht and her husband, Chris Precht. The concept consists of a playful take on modular, eco-treehouses of truncated timber. Bert's design revolves around a circular base, featuring modular cells shaped like tubes. These cells house various amenities such as kitchens, living spaces, bedrooms, and bathrooms, which can be stacked around and above it, resembling the branching limbs of a tree extending from its trunk. It is designed in a modular system, allowing for clients to customize the spaces to their needs.

== Recognition ==
Studio Precht was awarded Architizer's Emerging Firm of the Year Award at the A+Awards Gala in 2016.

The firms took first place for Best Architectural Startup in 2017 by Archipreneur.
