= Penninic thrustfront =

The Penninic thrustfront is a major tectonic thrustfront in the French Alps. The thrustfront moves over a developing decollement horizon, and separates the (internal) high grade metamorphic rocks of the Penninic nappes from the (external) sedimentary rocks and crystalline basement of the Helvetic nappes. The last are in France often called zone Dauphiné or Dauphinois.

Thrusting over the decollement horizon continues today, as the Apulian tectonic plate moves westward, converging with the Eurasian Plate.
