= Giudicarie Line =

The Giudicarie Line is a major geologic fault zone in the Italian Alps, named for the Giudicarie valleys area. It runs from Meran in the northeast more or less straight along the lower part of the Val di Sole, along the Val Rendena (upper Sarca valley) and then along the Chiese valley to the Lago d'Idro (Idro Lake).

The north part of the line is part of the Periadriatic Seam that separates the Southern Alps from the nappe stacks of the Central Alps and runs from west to east along the Alpine mountain chain. The Periadriatic Seam branches off to the west at the upper Val di Sole, where it is called the Tonale line. The northeast-oriented Giudicárie line off-sets the (east-west) Periadriatic Seam by 100 kilometers.

The fault zone contains older (Tertiary) mylonites, showing it was a ductile shearzone in that period. These mylonites have been overprinted by brittle thrusting still active today. The northwest dipping fault plane serves as a dextral transform fault as well as a compressive thrust fault.
