= Bündner schist =

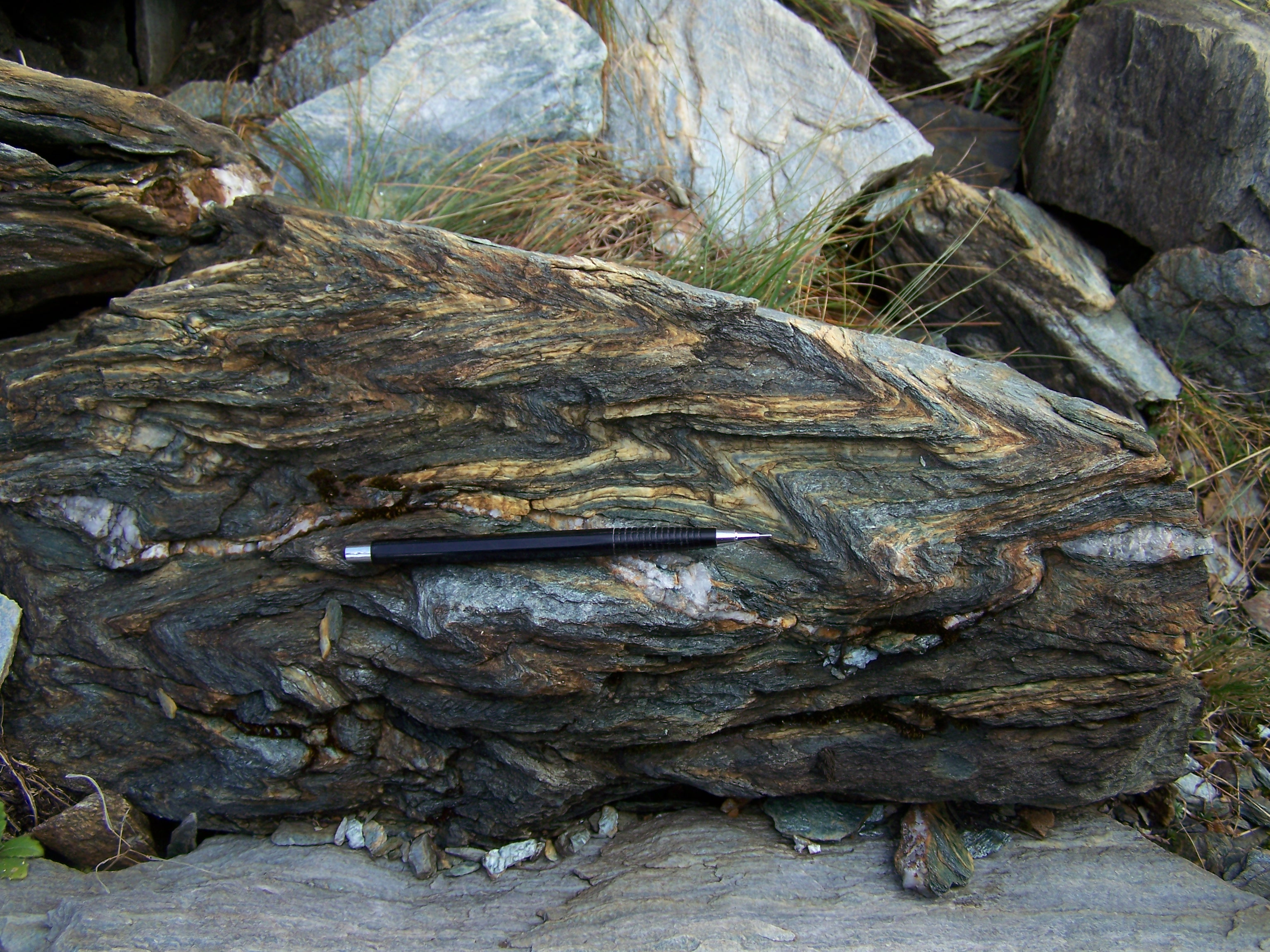
Isoclinally folded Bündner schists with alternating green (chlorite rich) and white (dolomite rich) layers. Location: Adula nappe, Lukmanier pass (Switzerland).

The Bündner schist or Bündner slate (German: Bündnerschiefer; French: schistes lustrés) is a collective name for schistose rocks that form a number of geologic formations in the Penninic nappes of the Alps. Bündner schists were originally marine sediments that underwent metamorphism at large depths.

The Bündner schists were deposited in the two small oceanic basins (the Valais Ocean and the Piemont-Liguria Ocean) that were located south of the European continent in the Mesozoic era. They formed a kilometers thick monotonous layer of dark clays, marbles and sandy limestones. These sediments were subducted to great depths during the Alpine orogeny. The resulting metamorphism and deformation turned them into calcareous phyllites and schists, strongly foliated rocks rich in micas.

The Bündner schists can be found throughout the Penninic zone of the Alps, often forming zones of high strain between or large infolded synclines (so called Mulde or Mulden) in the crystalline nappes that are made of more competent gneiss.

Bündner schists are often found along ophiolites. The contacts between the two types of rock have always seen many phases of folding and are complex.
