= Greywacke zone =

Geological layer in Austrian Alps

The Greywacke Zone (or Grauwackenzone in the original German) is a band of Paleozoic metamorphic rocks, dominated by units of metamorphosed sedimentary rock, that forms an east-west band through the Austrian Alps.

Stratigraphically, the Greywacke Zone can be up to 2 kilometres (1.2 mi) thick and it is built up from several individual nappes.

The zone is part of the Austroalpine nappe system and has a generally northward dip. It crops out between the Mesozoic rocks of the Northern Calcareous Alps and the Austroalpine and Penninic basement rocks of the Central Eastern Alps. The southern contact, with the basement rocks of the Austroalpine and Penninic nappes is a steeply dipping fault. The northern contact, with the Northern Calcareous Alps, is more complicated, it has rocks typical of the Greywacke Zone intercalated with those typical of the Northern Calcareous Alps and has been interpreted as a disrupted unconformable contact.

== Composition ==
A direct translation from the original German of 'Grauwackenzone' to the English 'Greywacke Zone' is misleading, although the unit is largely composed of grey rocks it contains few actual greywackes.

The Greywacke Zone rocks have been dated by their fossil content and they range from Upper Ordovician to the Carboniferous in age. They are quite varied lithologically and include phyllites, clastic and carbonaceous metasediments and some conglomeritic units as well as felsic and mafic volcanic rocks. The sequence has been metamorphosed under lower greenschist conditions with temperature estimates as high as 500c, although one of the nappes in the sequence includes 'basement' material which has reached the amphibolite grade of metamorphism.

Another of the nappes, the Noric nappe, hosts the largest iron ore deposit in Austria which is worked in the Erzberg mine.

== Formation ==
The rocks were formed at a passive margin of the Paleo-Tethys Ocean, when the Austroalpine terrain was part of the micro-continent Avalonia. Together with the other Austroalpine units, they were thrust over the Eurasian Plate during the Alpine orogeny.
