= Overprinting (geology) =

Geological process that leaves marks altering the marks of an earlier process

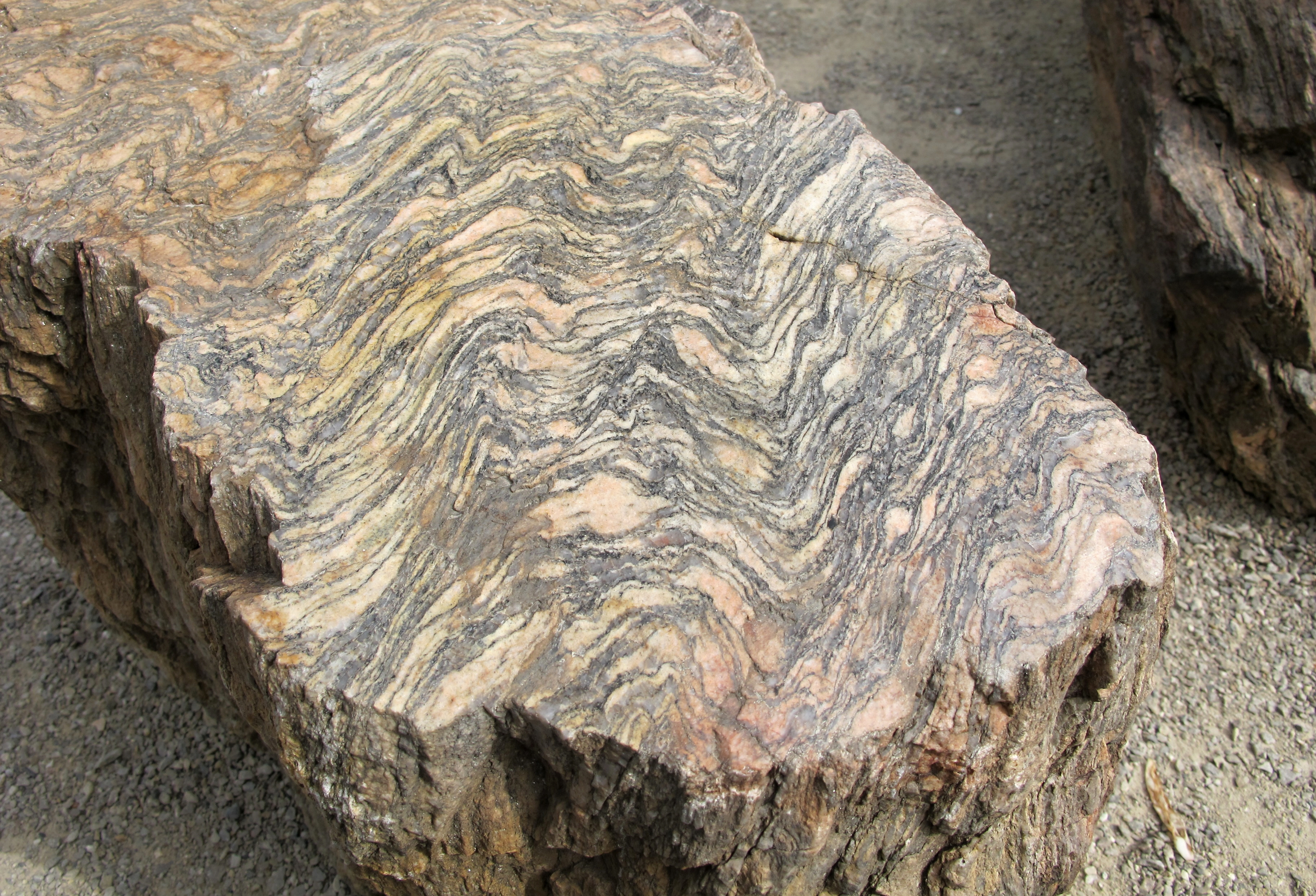
In this orthogneiss from the Czech Republic the original igneous rock texture has been overprinted by foliation associated with metamorphism.

Overprinting is a geological process that superimposes a set of characteristics on rock that partially obscure earlier characteristics. Examples include metamorphic overprinting (superimposed metamorphism), in which new structure, texture, or mineral composition is imposed on existing rock. For example, the Tauern window of Alps contains beds that were originally metamorphosed to eclogite but have since been overprinted to the blueschist and then the greenschist facies. Likewise, deformation associated with the Mazatzal orogeny in Arizona and New Mexico, US, was subsequently overprinted by deformation associated with the Picuris orogeny.

Geochemical signatures can also be overprinted when the geochemistry of a geological body is changed by eliminating or modifying the earlier geochemical signature.
