= Engadin window =

Exposure of penninic rock lying below the austroalpine rocks

Coordinates: 46°58′15″N 10°23′15″E

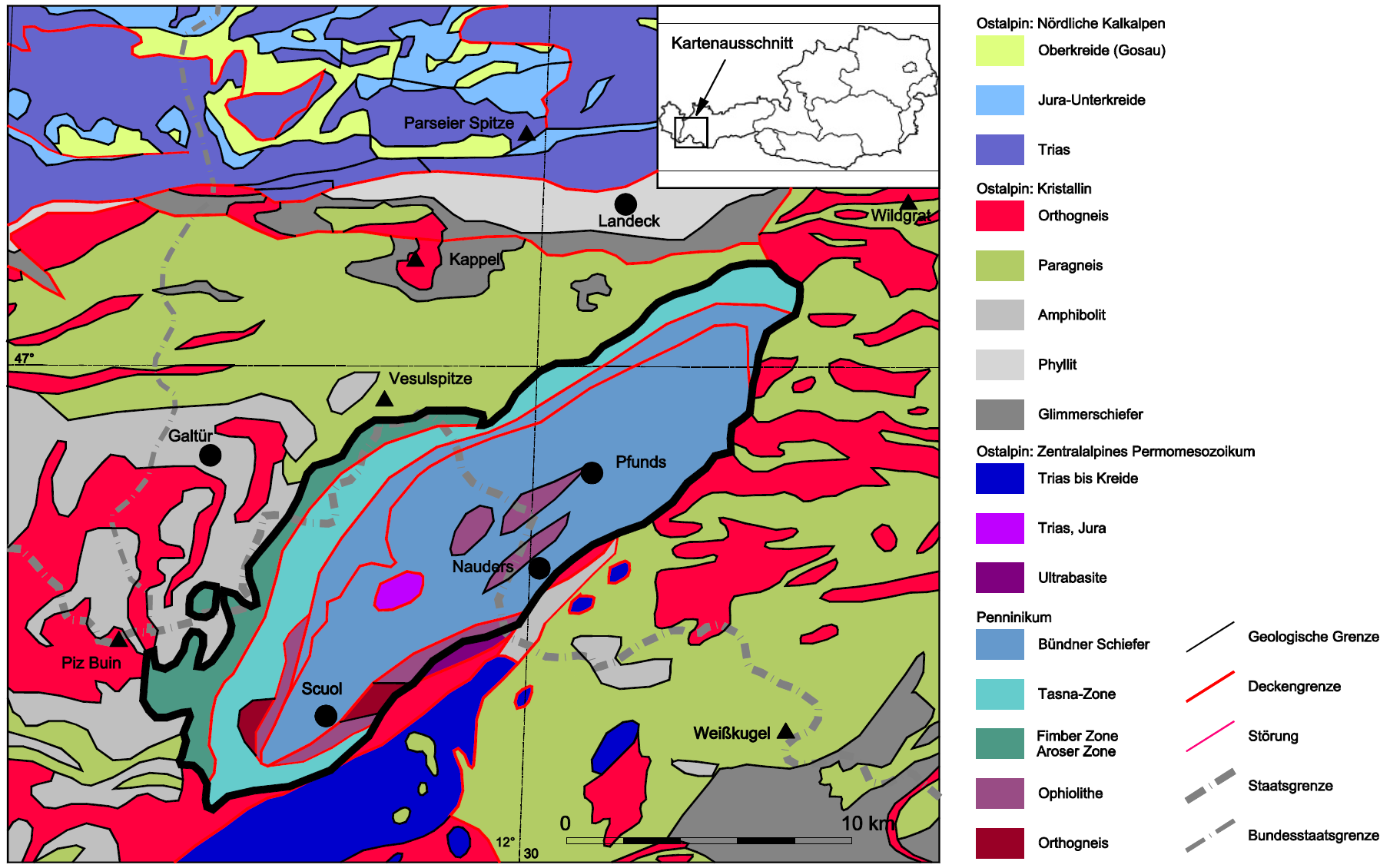
Overview of the Engadin window and the surrounding austroalpine units.

The Engadin window or (Lower Engadin window) is a tectonic window that exposes penninic units lying below the austroalpine units in the alpine nappe stack. It has a roughly elliptical shape with the long axis striking northwest–southeast and dimensions of 55 x 17 km.

From a geographic perspective the window stretches from Zernez (Graubünden, Switzerland) to Landeck (Tirol, Austria), or the Lower Engadin.

== Overview ==
The rocks cropping out in the Engadin window are weakly metamorphosed sediments of middle Jurassic to Eocene age. Most of them are interpreted as deposits from turbidites. They are seen as part of the penninic units similar to the rocks that make up large portions of the Switzerland. Furthermore, the sediments are attributed to the Valais ocean, the Briançonnais microcontinent, and the Piemont-Liguria Ocean. The metamorphic overprint was caused by the closure of the Valais and the Piemont-Liguria during the Paleogene part of the Alpine orogeny. The rocks experienced low-temperature-high-pressure overprint which reached the blueschist facies.

On geologic maps the Engadine window has an onion shell appearance. From outside to inside, or from highest to lowest in the nappe stack, the following units are distinguished:

- Fimber zone (including Arosa zone)
- Tasna zone
- Champatsch zone
- Pfundser zone

== Other tectonic windows ==
The Engadin window is not the only place where penninic units are exposed within the austroalpine. The Tauern window is the largest one and lies east of the Engadin window. The Gargellen window in Vorarlberg is the smallest one. The Rechnitzer window is the easternmost tectonic window.
