= Periadriatic Seam =

Border between the Adriatic and European plates

The Periadriatic Seam (or fault) is a distinct geologic fault in Southern Europe, running S-shaped about 1,000 km (621 mi) from the Tyrrhenian Sea through the whole Southern Alps as far as Hungary. It forms the division between the Adriatic plate and the Eurasian plate.

== Tectonics and geology ==
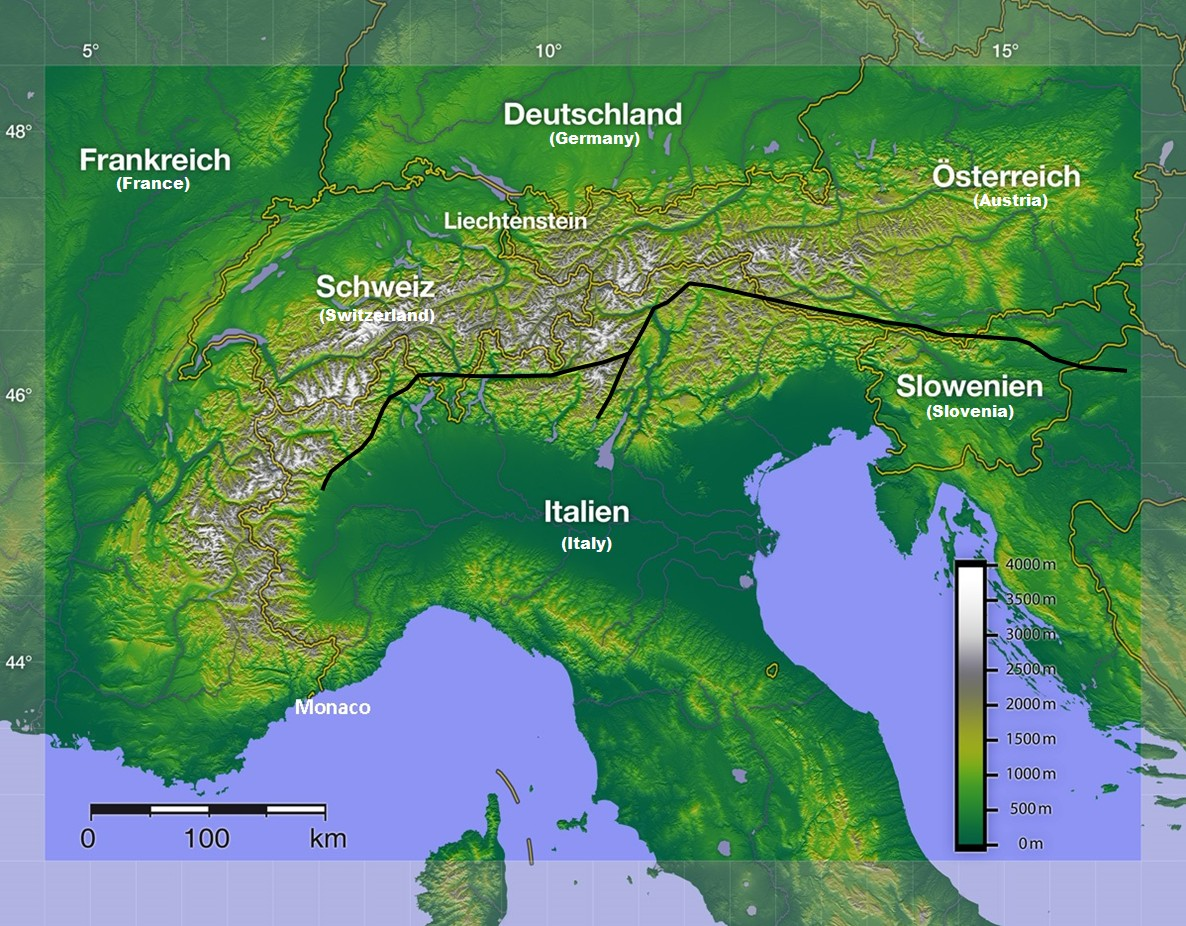
Alps relief with the Periadriatic Seam

Within the Eastern Alps, the line marks the border between the Central Eastern Alps and the Southern Limestone Alps. In the Western Alps it forms the division between the southern Apulian foreland and the central crystalline zones of the Alps.

Continental collision is still going on, with the Apulian and Eurasian plates still converging. The central zones of the Alps are rising too, causing vertical slip along the fault. The result is the set of major fault zones collectively named Periadriatic Seam. Movement along the Periadriatic Seam is the cause for the earthquake zone between Vienna and Friuli. The last destructive earthquake happened in Friuli in 1976.

The uplift caused violent erosion of the young orogen, which led to the formation of the Hohe Tauern window. At several regions a heavy uplift of the Central Alps by some kilometers took place, and also a shift of more than 50 km.

== Geographic position and names ==
From east to west, the course of the Periadriatic Seam and the names given to it regionally are as follows:

- Drau line: Pannonian Basin – Pohorje – Karawanks – Drau valley (Jauntal, Rosental) – Rosegg
- Gailtal line: Villach – Gail valley – Kartitsch
- Pustertal line: Sillian – Puster Valley – Bruneck
- Giudicárie line: Meran – Val di Sole
- Insubric line: Tonale Pass – Val Camonica – Valtellina – Piano di Magadino – Ivrea zone. It is composed of the east–west running Tonale line to the east and the curved Canavese line, which follows the Western Alps inner arc, to the west. The two lines meet near Locarno in the canton of Ticino in Switzerland. The Cavanese line is forms the NNE-SSW striking boundary between the Ivrea Zone (Southern Alps) and Sesia zone (Central Alps) and together with the Ivrea Zone, geometrically it forms backbone of the inner arc of the Western Alps.

== See also ==
- Adriatic plate, also known as Apulian plate – Small tectonic plate in the Mediterranean
- Engadine Line – Strike-slip Fault in Switzerland, Italy and Austria
- Geology of the Alps
