= Dent Blanche nappe =

Geological formation in the Pennine Alps

The Dent Blanche nappe or Dent Blanche klippe is a geologic nappe and klippe that crops out in the Pennine Alps. The nappe is tectonostratigraphically on top of the Penninic nappes and by most researchers seen as Austroalpine. The nappe is named after the mountain Dent Blanche, which is formed by rocks of the nappe. The most famous outcrop of the nappe is the Matterhorn, which is made of an erosional remnant (klippe) of Dent Blanche material lying on top of Penninic ophiolites (Zermatt-Saas zone). Because of this the rock at the top of the Matterhorn came from Africa, as the Austroalpine nappes are fragments of the African Plate.
