= Hohe Tauern window =

Austrian Central Eastern Alps region with exposed Penninic nappes

Coordinates: 47°00′N 12°30′E

The Tauern Window is a geological structure in the Austrian Central Alps. It is a region where a window (sometimes referred to by the German word: fenster) has been formed by uplift and erosion of the Austroalpine nappes to expose the rocks of the underlying Penninic nappes. The smaller Engadin window in western Austria/Switzerland, the Gargellen window in Vorarlberg and the Rechnitzer window in the Kőszeg Mountains of eastern Austria are all similar in nature and have similar origins.

== Location ==
The Tauern window extends across parts of the Austrian provinces of Tyrol, Salzburg and Carinthia and from the Brenner Pass in the west to the Schladming – Mauterndorf line in the east, to the southwest it extends to Sterzing in the South Tyrol of Italy. It has a length of about 176 km from the south-west corner of the Brenner Pass to Schladming in the northeast and a north-south extension of about 30 km between Mittersill and Matrei. At its widest point between St Johann im Pongau and Spittal, it measures almost 54 km. The Tauern window encompasses most of the Zillertal Alps and the Hohe Tauern range.

The relatively hard rocks of the area are more resistant to erosion, so the area has high topographic relief and most of Austria's highest mountains, including the Großglockner 3,798 m (12,461 ft) and Großvenediger 3,674 m (12,054 ft), are within the area of the window.

The 55km long Brenner Base Tunnel (scheduled for completion in 2032) cuts through the western end of the Tauern window and runs approximately perpendicular to the fold axes of the upright folds of the Tauern window. The geophysical investigations and drill-cores collected during the three decades of site investigation before 2007, when construction of the tunnel started, along with observations made during the construction project, have provided a huge amount of geological and structural data which has helped to clarify many aspects of the Tauern window's geology.

== Rocks units ==
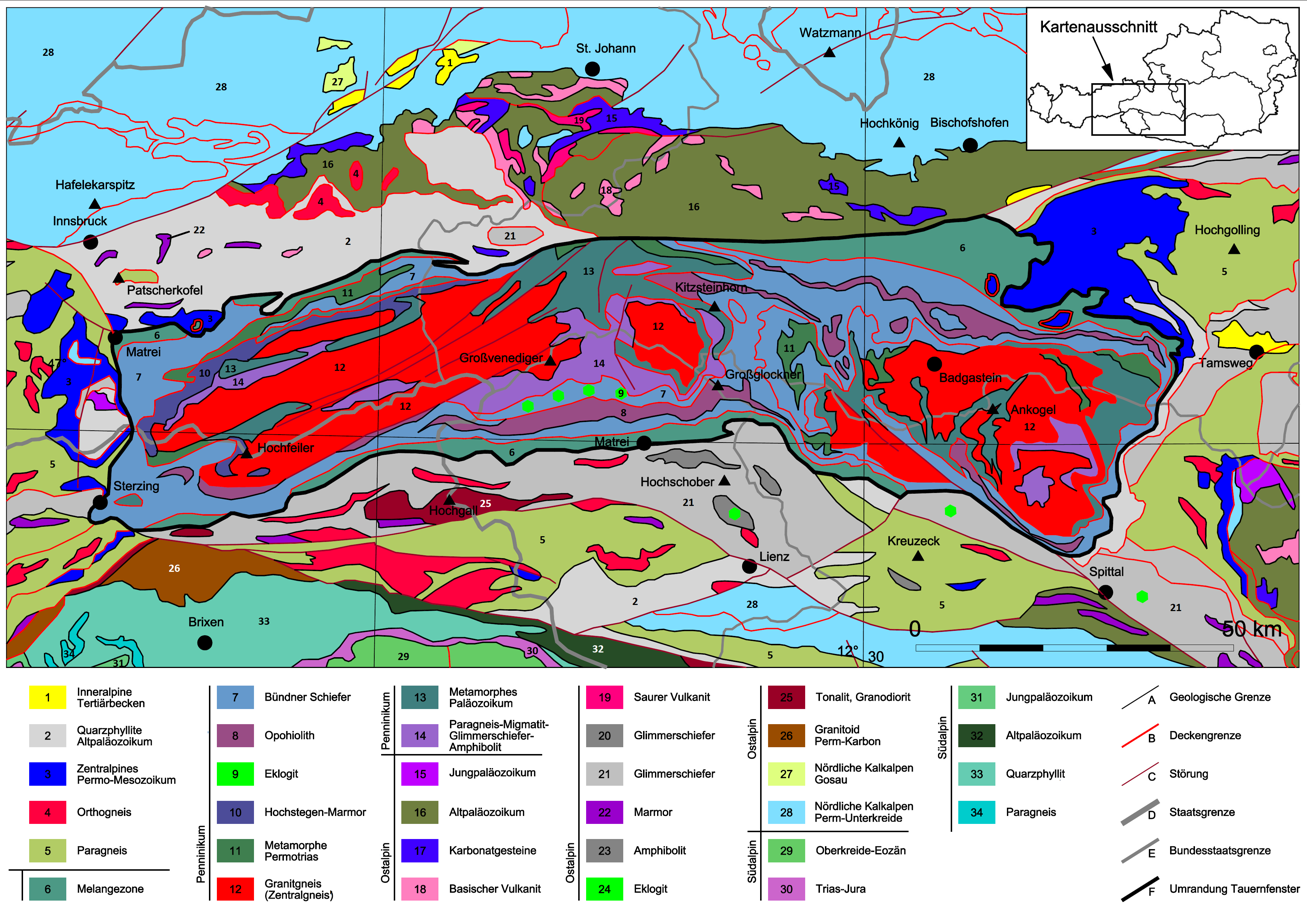
Geological map of the Tauern Window

The deepest structural units of the Eastern Alps are exposed in the Tauern window, these form the Venediger Nappe system (a sequence of nappes sometimes referred to as the Venediger Duplex). The main rock units of the Venediger Duplex are:

- a core of Precambrian and Cambrian gneisses forming the continental basement (unit 14 on the map), these are the oldest and are succeeded by:
- various metamorphic rocks (including ophiolites and schists) of Paleozoic age (unit 13 on the map);
- younger Variscan (late Carboniferous) granitic intrusions (turned into gneisses by deformation in the Alpine orogeny) (unit 12 on the map).

The Penninic Glockner nappe system (unit 7 on the map) overlies the Venediger Duplex. Several nappes have been distinguished within the Glockner nappe system which is an ophiolite bearing unit, of probable Cretaceous age, and is composed of a sequence of rocks which were deposited on oceanic lithosphere.

The Venediger Duplex and the overlying Glockner nappe system are surrounded by a mélange zone (unit 6 on the map) which marks the outer margin of the Tauern window, the melange includes blocks which are several km across. The rocks outside that region are part of the system of Austroalpine nappes, these are structurally above and surround the nappes of the Pennine zone exposed in the Tauern window. There are also klippe of Austroalpine nappes resting on Penninic material within the Tauern window (e.g. unit 11 on the map). The Northern Limestone Alps form unit 28 across the northern part of the map.

Separate stratigraphic units and individual nappes within both the Venediger and Glockner nappe systems have been identified and named. Igneous rocks are prominent in parts but, apart from the associated basement, these systems are largely metasedimentary sequences dominated by phyllites, schists and gneisses. However, the rocks of these nappe systems have been subjected to a series of metamorphic events and are intensely deformed, stratigraphic analysis and correlation is made difficult by the level of metamorphism and the large recumbent folds affecting the sequence.

== Depositional, tectonic and metamorphic history ==
The metasedimentary rocks which today comprise the Venediger Duplex are interpreted as having been deposited as a sequence of sediments on the distal European margin which faced the Valais Ocean. The rocks which today form the Glockner nappe system are derived from sediments which were deposited largely on oceanic lithosphere of the Valais Ocean itself, and fragments of the oceanic crust on which they were deposited. The rocks comprising the lower Austroalpine nappes are interpreted as sediments deposited at the most distal passive margin of the Adria plate.

The basement on which the sediments of the European margin and the Adria plate were deposited is pre-Variscan, it was metamorphosed and deformed during the Variscan orogeny. Later that basement, and the younger post-Variscan cover which overlies it, were subjected to two distinct Alpine orogenic events: (a) the Cretaceous Eoalpine event, which was related to the closure of the Meliata Ocean and caused by a westward-directed movement of Austroalpine nappes (Adria-derived), and (b) the Cenozoic Neoalpine orogeny, characterized by nearly northward convergence. The latter started with the southerly subduction of the Penninic Ocean underneath the Adriatic plate. The collision between Europe and the Adria margin during the Oligocene led to the formation of the nappe stacks exposed in the Tauern window today.

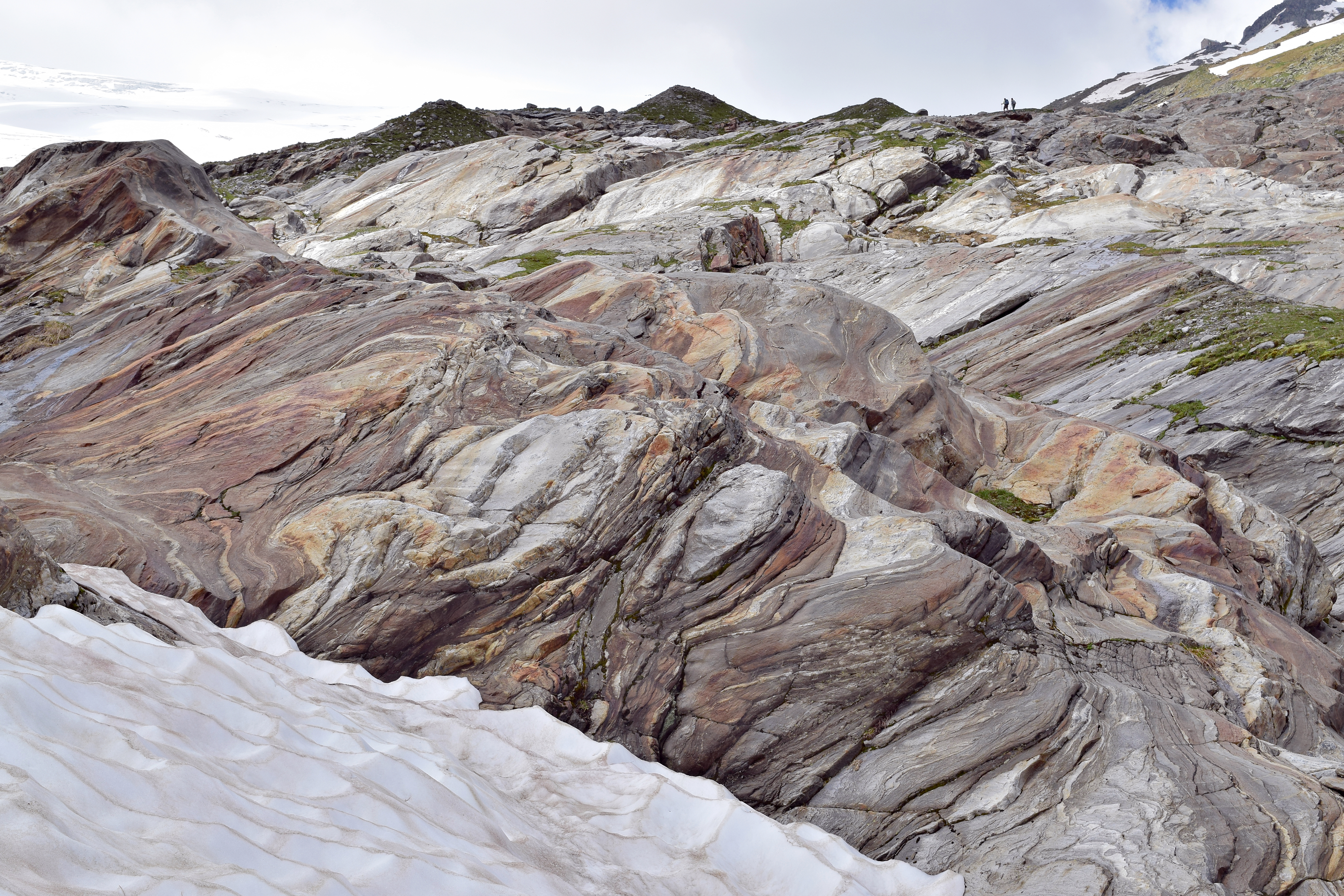
Outcropping paragneiss of the Venediger nappe system at the Schlatenkees near the source of the Tauernbach (a tributary of the Isel), about 20 km northwest of Matrei in Osttirol.

The rocks of the Tauern underwent several phases of metamorphism during this sequence of events but each of the main rock units which are today exposed there has a distinctly different thermobarometric record. At one extreme, the Eclogite Zone experienced high-pressure metamorphism at about 90 km depth (~25 kbar, 630 °C), whereas the directly overlying Glockner nappe was subjected to ~7.5kbar, 525 °C and the structurally deeper Venediger nappe experienced a maximum pressure of 10–11kbar at ~550 °C. The metamorphic and tectonic effects of the Alpine orogenic events (and, in the case of pre-Variscan basement, the earlier Variscan events) were later overprinted by doming and lateral extrusion during the Miocene when the Tauern window was finally exhumed by the northward push of the south-alpine Dolomites indenter. That part of the Tauern's structural history has involved rapid uplift of 20–30km since Oligocene times.

The associated Austroalpine nappes were subjected to intense deformation and greenschist-blueschist overprinting from the onset of the Piemont-Liguria Ocean in the late-Cretaceous through to final closure of the Valais Ocean in the Eocene.

== See also ==
- Penninic nappes – Geological formation in the Alps
