= Austroalpine nappes =

Geological formation in the European Alps

The Austroalpine nappes are a geological nappe stack system in the European Alps. They are structurally on top of the Penninic (meaning they were thrust over them). The prefix Austro in this term refers to Austria, rather than south/southern. This is because the bulk of the Austroalpine nappes (which constitute the Eastern Alps except for some tectonic windows) is in Austria, although they also reach into Eastern Switzerland. The western boundary of the Eastern Alps is the Lake Constance - Chur – Lake Como line.

== Geographic position and nappes in the Western Alps ==
The Austroalpine nappes constitute the Eastern Alps, except for some tectonic windows such as the Tauern window, the Rechnitz window (both in Austria) and the Engadin window (Switzerland). They cover eastern Switzerland and the largest part Austria.

In the Western Alps the Sesia (Italy) and the Dent Blanche (Switzerland) units form a klippe over the Penninic nappes. They have been labelled as Austroalpine because this term has also been generally used to refer to units derived from the Adriatic plate. However, they are distinct from and unrelated to the Austroalpine nappes of the Eastern Alps. They have a different palaeogeographic origin and tectonic history. Thus, they are not always considered a part of the Austroalpine nappes. The Matterhorn is the most outstanding example of this klippe.

== Eoalpine formation of the Austroalpine nappes and the Eastern Alps ==
The formation of the Alps occurred in two orogenic phases. The Austroalpine nappes of the Eastern Alps were formed in the first, early, Eo-Alpine orogeny in the Early Cretaceous, 140-84 Ma (millions years ago). The Central and Western Alps were formed in the second orogenic phase which occurred much later, from the end of Eocene, 35 Ma.

The eo-Alpine orogeny resulted from the continental collision between the north-western corner of the Adriatic plate (overriding plate) and a continental fragment, Alcapa, (Note: Alcapa stand for Alps-Carpathians-Pannonian. It refers to an area where these two mountain ranges and (later) the Pannonian basin were formed.) (subducting plate). This followed the subduction and closure of a western embayment of the Meliata Ocean which was between them. This ocean was to the east of the former and south of the latter. It was a northern branch of the Neotethys Ocean which had opened in the Triassic.

In this orogeny the Austroalpine nappes and the Western Carpathians ware formed on Alcapa, while the South Alpine nappes were formed on the Adriatic plate. Parts of Alcapa were accreted to the base and leading edge of the Adriatic plate. The movement of the thrust front was from southwest to northwest.

At the time of the eo-Alpine orogeny the Adriatic plate was further southeast than its present location. It was separated from the European continental margin of the time by the Piemont part of the Piemont-Liguria Ocean. Later this ocean started to subduct. The Adriatic plate moved north-westward, converged with Europe and reached its current position. These two plates eventually collided, leading to the second orogenic phase.

== Structure ==
The Austroalpine nappes (which originally were between the Piemont-Liguria Ocean, at its southern end, and the Meliata Ocean, at its northern end) are divided into the lower and upper nappes. Their structure is as follows:

• Upper Austroalpine nappes. These were the nappes which were displaced the most during the eo-Alpine orogeny. They build up the Northern Calcareous Alps. Their lower nappes tend to be in their north, while the higher ones are in their south. These nappes are divided into three juxtaposed nappes systems. From upper to lower position they are:

A) Juvavic nappes. These are a series of klippen overlying the Tirolian nappes. It was the accretionary wedge which was accreted to the Northern Calcareous Alps. It became completely eroded. Its remnants are only preserved in rock blocks that were overthrust on top of Middle to Late Jurassic basin fills of basins that were in front or on top of the propagating thrust belt and were later overthrust.

A formation in the Lower Juvavic nappes at the Eastern Alps eastern margin with deep-water carbonates, radiolarites greywackes and tuff is seen as the remains of the accretionary wedge of the subduction zone. The Upper Juvavic nappes originate from the distal (outer, next to the deep-waters of an ocean) area of the passive continental margin of the Adriatic plate along the northern end of the Meliata ocean.

B) Tirolian nappes. These nappes are the sedimentary cover thrust directly above the sediments of the greywacke zone. These two units originally were in the same position in the passive margin along the northern end of the Meliata Ocean. The Tirolian nappes have internal thrusting and faulting but only minor folding because they are dominantly dolomite.

C) Bavarian nappes. These are lowermost nappes. They are at the northern rim of the Eastern Alps and directly overly Penninic units derived from the Piemont-Liguria Ocean. Unlike the Juvavic and Tirolian nappes, they originate from the distal (outer) area of the passive continental margin at the southern end of the Piemont-Liguria Ocean and in a relatively more external position with respect to the earlier formed passive margin at the northern end of the Meliata Ocean which was further south.

There is also the Greywacke zone, which is a narrow strip of Palaeozoic sediments (greywackes, shales and limestones and others). It is the former substratum of the Tirolian nappes which were deposited directly above them. This zone was in the passive continental margin at the northern end of the Meliata Ocean. It is thought to have been originally the Palaeozoic basement of the Tirolian nappes Mesozoic rocks. They remained several km behind in the south during the nappe movement.

The Northern Calcareous nappes and the greywacke zone form a large thin-skinned fold and thrust belt.

• Lower Austroalpine nappes. These were the (Variscan) basements of the nappes of the eo-Alpine orogeny over which the other (sedimentary) Austroalpine nappes were thrust. They are widespread in Eastern Switzerland, particularly along the SW margin of the Austroalpine nappes. They are also found along the NE margin and, occasionally, the northern margin of the Tauern window. They were derived from a very external part of the Adriatic plate that faced the Piemont-Liguria Ocean.

These nappes were not moved during the Eo-Alpine orogeny and were only slightly overprinted during this orogeny. They were eroded away and comprise only a few nappes. The border between the Eastern and Western Alps (eastern Switzerland and easternmost Austria) are the western end of the eo-Alpine orogeny.

== The question of the suture zone ==
Suture zones mark the areas where two landmasses have amalgamated after the closure of an oceanic basin. The two elements which aid their identification is the presence of traces of ophiolites which have been obducted onto continental crust during continental collision and/or eclogitic units which indicate subduction of rocks to great depths, reaching high or ultrahigh pressure in subduction metamorphism. In the Austroalpine nappes identifying sutures is particularly difficult because these have been heavily eroded.

Findings related to a suture have led to question marks regarding the dynamics of the eo-Alpine orogeny and its timeframe.

The Koralpe-Wölz nappe system is a narrow high-pressure metamorphic belt. It is a candidate for the Eo-Alpine suture. However, there are disagreements regarding its nature and timing.

This nappe system comprises a series of basement units that have a significant eo-Alpine metamorphic overprint. Its largest occurrences are east of the Tauern window. They become gradually more spread out eastwards. There are eclogitic units which indicate subduction to great depths. These are underlain by basement units that indicate lower pressures and temperatures metamorphism.

Schmid et al. (2004) propose that they were exhumed northward in an extrusion wedge. The eo-Alpine high pressure metamorphic overprint and the subsequent extrusion were caused by the collision between the northern and southern margins of the Meliata ocean (eo-Alpine orogeny).

However, the metamorphism in this high pressure belt occurred in the Late Cretaceous, whereas the nappe thrusting of the eo-Alpine orogeny was completed in the Early Cretaceous. Moreover, there are no traces of oceanic crust. The eclogites are seen as being from intra-continental gabbros, indicating an intracontinental subduction.

Kurtz and Fritz (2003) propose that the eo-Alpine orogeny might have been a two-stage cycle. The first one involved subduction and closure of the Meliata ocean (Late Jurassic) and the formation of the Northern Calcareous Alps (Early Cretaceous). The second one involved southward magmatic underplating of the continental margin of the Adriatic plate and imbrication of the Austroalpine basements which underwent metamorphism. This increased from greenschist-facies in the northern parts to amphibolite and eclogite facies in its southernmost parts.

The origin of the second phase was probably rifting, crustal extension and crustal thinning in the Permian accompanied by magmatic underplating in the internal parts of the orogen. Heating of the crust by the latter created high temperature metamorphism in some rocks. With later cooling, the crust thickened again. It became gravitationally unstable causing the onset of subduction inside the continent. The high-pressure metamorphic rocks were exhumed in the Late Cretaceous through a detachment fault in the lower crust.

On the basis of an analysis of detrital chrome spinel grains found southwest of Salzburg (in the Hallstatt Mélange area of the Saalach Zone, western central Northern Calcareous Alps), Gawlick et al. (2015) propose that the eo-Alpine orogeny stated earlier than the usually indicated timeframe (Early Cretaceous).

These authors argue that their study indicates that in the southern Northern Calcareous Alps ophiolite obduction occurred earlier, in the Middle to early Late Jurassic. This obducted ophiolite stack erosion started in the Kimmeridgian (Late Jurassic) and lasted until the Aptian (late Early Cretaceous). Erosion was slowed down by a Kimmeridgian to earliest Cretaceous carbonate platform that evolved on top of the nappe stack with the obducted ophiolites. It protected the ophiolites against erosion. Afterwards, the ophiolites were quickly eroded.

== Lateral escape ==
Lateral escape or extrusion refers to the horizontal (sideways) movement of a landmass. It can be sinistral (left-lateral) or dextral (right –lateral). The sideways movement is caused by a thrust. In the case of the Austroalpine nappes and the Eastern Alps thrusting was caused by indenter tectonics. In a continental collision one of the two colliding tectonic plates is rigid (with strong lithosphere rocks) and the other is “soft” (with weaker lithosphere rocks). The former acts as an indenter which thrusts into the rocks of the latter, which become deformed, shortened and extended (stretched) due to the indentation, causing lateral escape.

During the collision between the Adriatic plate and the European continental imaging, thrusting by the former exerted a compressive regime and N-S crustal shortening. It also acted as an indenter which is divided into two parts, the Insubric and the Dolomites indenters. The latter is in the Southern Alps which are on this plate, south of the eastern part of the Northern Calcareous Alps. Since it is a protrusion, the largest amount of shortening is at its tip.

Due to indentation, instead of being thrust further northward towards the foreland basin, the Eastern Alps underwent a lateral pull-apart. They were strongly stretched, narrowed and elongated eastward (through lateral escape) to almost twice their original length.

The largest amount of shortening is at the tip of the Dolomites Indenter. Near this there has been the formation of the Tauern window, a pull-apart structure which underwent substantial stretching and elongation. The Ötztal and Gurktal blocks, which are just east and west of the window, were moved 160 km apart.

Rosenberg et al. (2018) estimate that shortening in the western part of the Eastern Alps amounted to 75 km, 55 km of which were accommodated in the Tauern Window. These figures in Handy et al. (2011) are 125 km and 70 km of accommodation in the Tauern window. Frisch et al. (2000) estimate that at the northern tip of the Dolomite indenter it was 113 km.

Shortening decreased eastward (there the Eastern Alps broaden) because convergence between the two tectonic plates decreased. Frisch et al. (2000) estimate an amount of 40 km the eastern margin; Rosenberg et al. (2018) estimate 30 km.

Some estimates for the total amount of extension in the Eastern Alps are 170 km and 130 km (ca. 85 km of which is in the North-Calcareous Alps and ca. 45 km is immediately north of the indenter).

Frisch et al. (2000) propose that the eastward movement of the Eastern Alps was made possible because there was an oceanic basin in the area of the future Pannonian Basin where there was subduction with slab rollback. This provided the space to accommodate this movement.

Extension also occurred in Central Alps. The total stretching in the Central and Eastern Alps is estimated by Frisch et al. (2000) to have been more than 300 km. These authors also propose that these two parts of the Alps are part of an extensional province that also includes the Pannonian basin.

== Lithologies ==
The Austroalpine nappes are fragments of the former continental shelf and continental slope of the Apulian or Adriatic plate. These fragments contain rocks from the continental basement as well as from sedimentary rocks deposited in these environments.

The basement rocks have experienced metamorphism related to their original depth in the Earth's crust, but in the Austroalpine nappes Alpine metamorphism is fairly low grade to non-existent. The basement rocks can be greenschist facies to amphibolite facies, depending on their original depth. They are Paleozoic schists and (para-)gneisses intruded by granites of Variscan and Tertiary age.

Permian and Mesozoic sedimentary and volcanic rocks were deposited on top of these basement rocks. Shallow marine limestones are abundant, these limestones now form theNorthern Calcareous Alps, the mountain chains of the northern part of the Eastern Alps. Sometimes, the limestone has been turned into dolomite, as in the Austrian region Salzkammergut and the German region Allgäu.

A special unit is the greywacke zone, a band of Paleozoic metamorphosed sedimentary rocks that forms an east-west band through the Austrian Alps. It crops out between the Mesozoic rocks of the Tirolian nappes of the upper Austroalpine nappes. Stratigraphically, the greywacke zone can be up to 2 kilometres (1.2 mi) thick.

All of these lithologies were folded and thrust, so that the basement rocks can be found on top of the sedimentary rocks.

== Bibliography ==
- Frisch W., Dunkl I., J. Kuhlemann J., Post-collisional orogen-parallel large-scale extension in the Eastern Alps, Tectonophysics, Vol. 327, 2000, pp. 239–265
- Gawlick, H.-J., Frisch, W. (2003): The Middle to Late Jurassic carbonate clastic radiolaritic flysch sediments in the Northern Calcareous Alps: sedimentology, basin evolution and tectonics - an overview. – Neues Jahrbuch Geologie Paläontologie, Abhandlungen, Vol. 230 pp. 163–213.
- Gawlick H-J., Schlagintweit F., Missoni S. (2015) Ophiolitic detritus in Kimmeridgian resedimented limestones and its provenance from an eroded ophiolitic nappe stack south of the Northern Calcareous Alps (Austria) Geologica Carpathica, Vol 66 (6) pp. 473–487
- Handy M.R., Schmid S.M., Bousquet R., Kissling E., Bernoulli D.(2010) Reconciling plate-tectonic reconstructions of Alpine Tethys with the geological–geophysical record of spreading and subduction in the Alps, Earth Science Reviews, Vol. 102, pp. 121–158
- Handy M. R, Rosenberg C.L., Ustaszewski K., Spakman W. (2011) Fragmentation of the Adriatic Indenter and its bearing on changing slab configurations beneath the Alps-Carpathian-Dinaride chain, AGU Fall Meeting, 5–9 December
- Kurtz W., Fritz H. (2003) Thermometamophic evolution in the Austroalpine nappe complex in the eastern Alps –Consequences for the eo-Alpine subduction zone, International Geological Review, Vol. 45, (12) pp. 587–603
- Mandl G.W., (2000) The Alpine sector of the Tethyan shelf - Examples of Triassic to Jurassic sedimentation and deformation from the Northern Calcareous Alps, Mitteilungen Osterreichishen Geologischen Gesellschaft, Vol. 92, pp. 61–67
- Neukirchen F. (2022) The formation of Mountains, Springer, ISBN 978-3031113840
- Ratschbacher L., Frisch, W., Neubauer F., Schmid S.M., Neugebauer J. (1989) Extension in compressional orogenic belts: The Eastern Alps. Geology Vol. 17, pp. 404–407.
- Rosenberg C.L., Schneider S., Scharf, Bertrand A., Hammerschmidt K., Rabaute A., Brun J-P., Relating collisional kinematics to exhumation processes in the Eastern Alps, Earth-Science Reviews, Vol. 176, 2018, pp. 311–344.
- Schmid S.M., Fügenschuh B., Kissling E., Schuster R. (2004) Tectonic map and overall architecture of the Alpine orogen, Eclogae geologicae Helvetiae, Vol. 97, pp. 93–117
- Stüwe K., Schuster R. (2010) Initiation of a subduction in the Alps: continent or ocean? Geology, Vol. 38, pp. 175–178
