= Southern Alps (Europe) =

The Southern Alps are a geological subdivision of Alps that are found south of the Periadriatic Seam, a major geological faultzone across the Alps. The southern Alps contain almost the same area as the Southern Limestone Alps. The rocks of the southern Alps gradually go over in the Dinarides or Dinaric Alps to the south-east. In the south-west they disappear below recent sediments of the Po basin that are lying discordant on top of them.

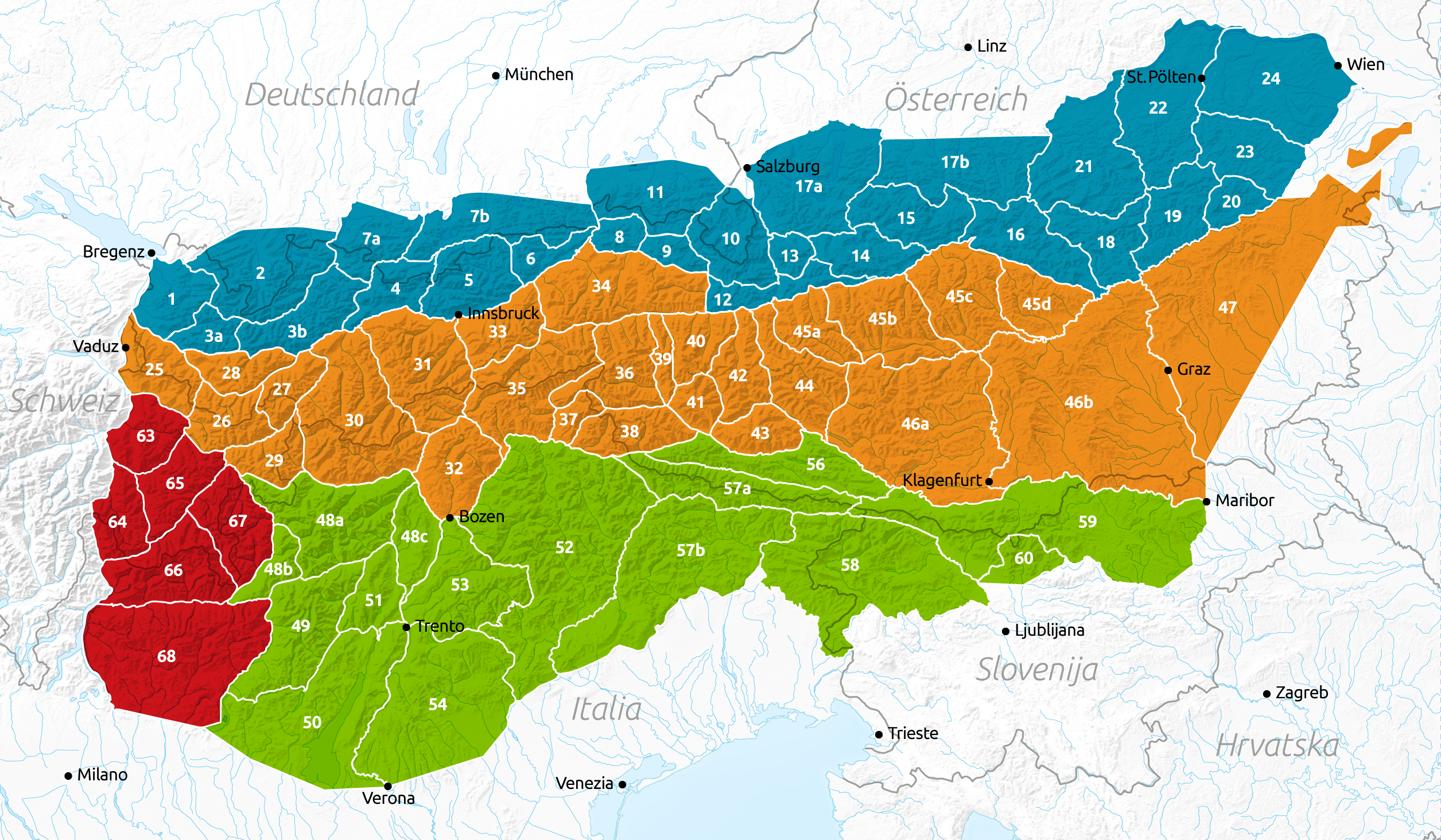
AVE classification of the Eastern Alps: Northern Limestone Alps Central Eastern Alps Southern Limestone Alps Western Limestone Alps

== Lithology ==
The Southern Alps are composed of material from the Adriatic or Apulian tectonic plate, the area is part of this plate. These are mainly Mesozoic sedimentary rocks, most of them limestones.

== Tectonics ==
In contrast to the Central Eastern Alps north of the Periadriatic Seam, the geology of the Southern Alps is not characterized by nappes. Neither are high grade metamorphic rocks common in the region. The Southern Alps are tectonically characterized by large scale thrusting and folding to the south, the dominant vergence (direction of fold asymmetry) in the region is southward. As is also the case in the southern foreland of the Pyrenees, thrusts in the Southern Alps are oriented along listric fault planes with relatively shallow decollement horizons.

To the west, south of the Valle d'Aosta, the Southern Alps form a huge monocline, up until the point that mantle material of the Apulian plate crops out in what is called the Ivrea zone.
