= Briançonnais zone =

Piece of continental crust in the Penninic nappes of the Alps

The Briançonnais zone is a zone in the Penninic nappes in the Western Alps which preserves continental crust rocks derived from the Briançonnais terrane.

The Briançonnais terrane or continental ribbon was a narrow strip of continental crust. It was part of the European continental margin before the Early Cretaceous opening of the Valais Ocean, which separated it from the rest of the margin. It was the eastern tip of the Iberian block (which also encompassed, besides the Iberian Peninsula, the Corsica-Sardinia block and the Balearic Islands, which later rifted from Iberia).

Because paleogeographic reconstructions of highly deformed pieces of crust are always difficult, in the past there was a dispute among geologists about whether the Briançonnais terrane had originally been part of the Eurasian plate or the Iberian block (which was a unit of the Eurasian plate).

The Briançonnais terrane and Briançonnais zone are named after the French town of Briançon in the Hautes-Alpes department.

== See also ==
- Microcontinent Iberia
