= Piemont-Liguria Ocean =

Former piece of oceanic crust that is seen as part of the Tethys Ocean

The Piemont-Liguria basin or the Piemont-Liguria Ocean (sometimes only one of the two names is used, for example: Piemonte Ocean) was a former piece of oceanic crust that is seen as part of the Tethys Ocean. Together with some other oceanic basins that existed between the continents Europe and Africa, the Piemont-Liguria Ocean is called the Western or Alpine Tethys Ocean.

== Plate tectonic history ==
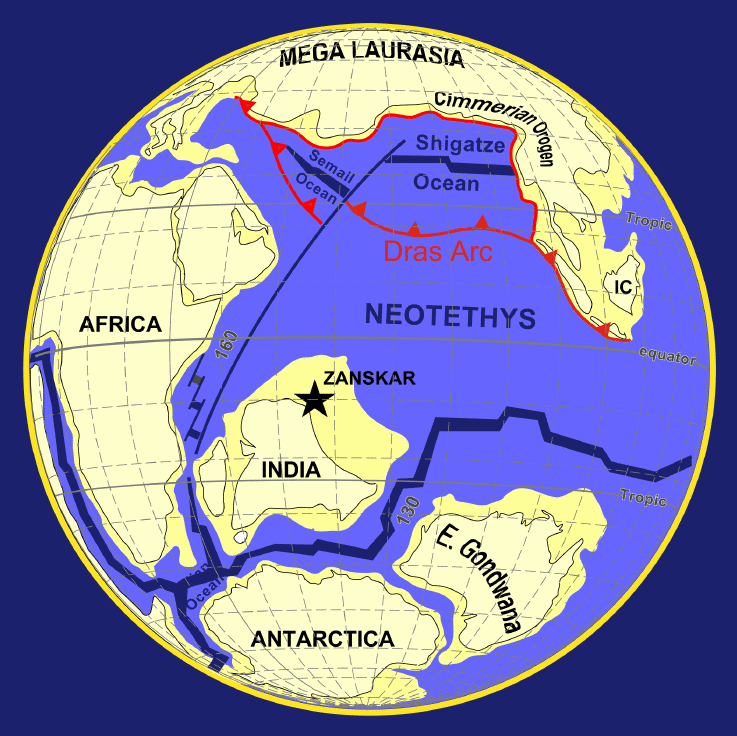
The Piemont-Liguria Ocean between the Apulian plate and the European continent (Mega Laurussia) in the Cretaceous (100 Ma). It can be seen on the northwest margin of the globe.

The Piemont-Liguria Ocean was formed in the Jurassic period, when the paleocontinents Laurasia (to the north, with Europe) and Gondwana (to the south, with Africa) started to move away from each other. The oceanic crust that formed in between the two continents became the Piemont-Liguria Ocean. In the Cretaceous period the Piemont-Liguria Ocean lay between Europe (and a smaller plate called the Iberian plate) in the northwest and the Apulian plate (a sub-plate of the African tectonic plate) in the southeast.

When the Apulian plate started moving to the northwest in the late Cretaceous, Piemont-Ligurian crust began to subduct beneath it. In the Paleocene the Piemont-Ligurian Ocean had completely disappeared under the Apulian plate and continental collision started between Apulia and Europe, which would lead to the formation of the Alps and the Apennines in the Tertiary.

== Remains ==
Fragments of Piemont-Ligurian oceanic crust were preserved as ophiolites in the Penninic nappes of the Alps and the Tuscan nappes of the Apennines. These nappes were subducted, sometimes to great depths in the mantle, before being obducted again. Due to the high pressures at these depths, much of the material had been metamorphosed in the blueschist or eclogite facies.

== See also ==
- Geology of the Alps – The formation and structure of the European Alps
- Pannonian Sea, also known as Paratethys Sea – Shallow ancient sea where the Pannonian Basin in Central Europe is today
