= Penninic =

Geological formation in the Alps

The Penninic nappes or the Penninicum, commonly abbreviated as Penninic, are one of three nappe stacks and geological zones in which the Alps can be divided. In the western Alps the Penninic nappes are more obviously present than in the eastern Alps (in Austria), where they crop out as a narrow band. The name Penninic is derived from the Pennine Alps, an area in which rocks from the Penninic nappes are abundant.

Of the three nappe stacks the Penninic nappes have the highest metamorphic grade. They contain high grade metamorphic rocks of different paleogeographic origins. They were deposited as sediments on the crust that existed between the European and Apulian plates before the Alps were formed. They are characteristically ophiolite sequences and deep marine sediments, metamorphosed to phyllites, schists and amphibolites.

Middle Penninic nappes include the Monte Rosa, Mont Fort, Siviez-Mischabel, Cimes Blanches and Frilihorn, of European origin. Upper Penninic nappes include the Zermatt-Saas and Tsaté, of oceanic origin and the Dent Blanche nappe (Austroalpine), of African origin.

== Subdivision in the Western Alps ==
Four paleogeographic domains can be recognized in the Penninic nappes of the Western Alps:

- rocks from the former European continental margin that were subducted and obducted again.
- rocks from the continental crust of the Valais Ocean, metamorphosed ophiolites and other sedimentary rocks from this disappeared oceanic basin. The occurrence of eclogite lenses shows these rocks were subducted to great depths in the Earth's mantle. Valais sedimentary rocks include thin Cretaceous limestones (now marbles) and Tertiary flysch which is now turned into (mica-) schists.
- rocks from the former Briançonnais microcontinent. These are rocks from the lower continental crust deformed and intruded by Variscan granites, but also metamorphosed sedimentary rocks: graphite-bearing Carboniferous rocks, red sandstones from the Permian period, Triassic evaporites and thin limestones of the Jurassic and lower Cretaceous. Examples of Briançonnais terranes are the Saint Bernard and Monte Rosa nappes; the Monte Rosa and the Mischabelhörner are formed by hard Briançonnais gneisses.
- rocks from the former Piemont-Liguria Ocean, mainly ophiolites (fragments of the oceanic crust of this domain); limestone deposited in shallower parts of the Piemont-Liguria ocean and turned into marble and originally deep marine mudstones formed in the oceanic trench that existed at the northern edge of the Apulian plate. From the Cretaceous onward the oceanic crust of the Piemont-Liguria ocean subducted at these trenches beneath the Apulian plate.

The Piemont-Liguria Ocean and the Valais Ocean are, together with some other small oceanic basins, called Alpine Tethys Ocean or Western Tethys Ocean. The Tethys Ocean itself is sometimes considered to have begun east of the Apulian and African plates, but normally the Alpine Tethys is regarded as part of it.

== Subdivision in the Eastern Alps ==
The following Penninic lithologies are found in the Hohe Tauern window, the Kőszeg Mountains and at the northern boundary of the Alps:

- old Precambrian and Cambrian gneisses of continental basement.
- various Paleozoic metamorphic rocks (ophiolites, schists)
- younger Hercynian (late Carboniferous) granite intrusions (turned into gneisses by deformation in the Alpine orogeny).
- Triassic and Jurassic sedimentary rocks and ophiolites, turned into calcareous phyllites and green schists by metamorphism. Cretaceous to early Tertiary flysch deposits are sometimes found stratigraphically on top of these.

It is not clear which of these units can be correlated with the Penninic units of the Western Alps. Some of them are clearly Penninic, some clearly Helvetic, and some are disputed.

The oceanic trench deposits of the Penninic nappes are found through the Alps and called Bündner slates.

What is clear at least is that the Briançonnais terrane is not found in the Eastern Alps. The conclusion that can be drawn is that the microcontinent wedged out in the east in the Alpine Tethys Ocean. Some authors suggest the ophiolites that occur at the Hohe Tauern window must be correlated with the Piemont-Liguria terrane of the western Alps, because trench deposits such as radiolarites occur in both.
