= Adriatic plate =

Small tectonic plate in the Mediterranean

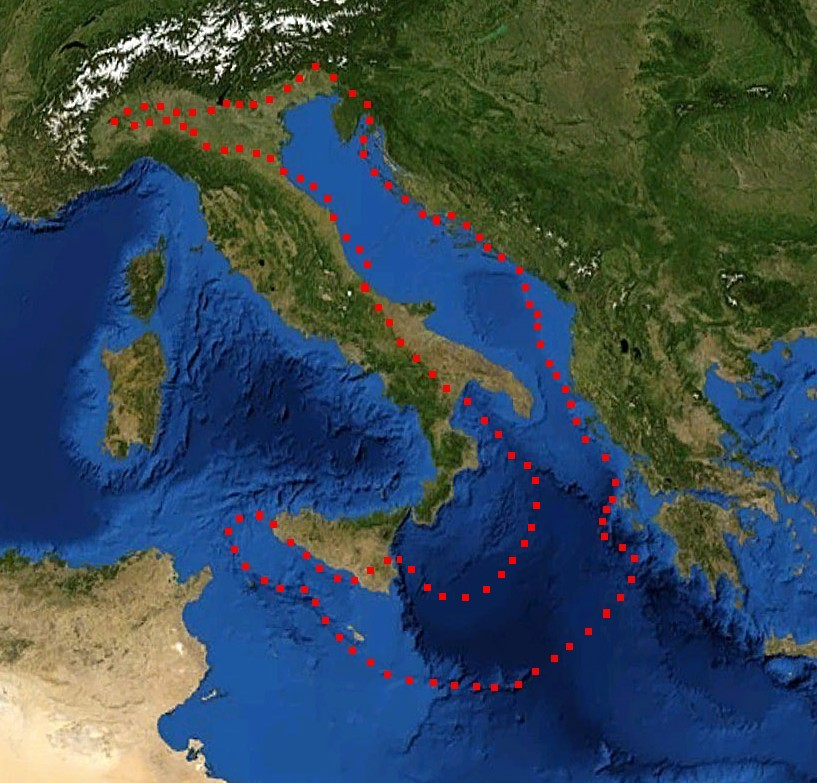
- Adriatic microplate boundaries
- Type: Microplate
- Movement^{1}: North-northeast
- Features: Southern Calcareous Alps
- ^{1}Relative to the African plate

The Adriatic or Apulian plate is a small tectonic plate carrying primarily continental crust that broke away from the African plate along a large transform fault in the Cretaceous period. The name Adriatic plate is usually used when referring to the northern part of the plate. This part of the plate was deformed during the Alpine orogeny, when the Adriatic/Apulian plate collided with the Eurasian plate.

The Adriatic/Apulian plate is thought to still move independently of the Eurasian plate in NNE direction with a small component of counter-clockwise rotation. The fault zone that separates the two is the Periadriatic Seam that runs through the Alps. Studies indicate that in addition to deforming, the Eurasian continental crust has actually subducted to some extent below the Adriatic/Apulian plate, an unusual circumstance in plate tectonics. Oceanic crust of the African plate is also subducting under the Adriatic/Apulian plate off the western and southern coasts of the Italian Peninsula, creating a berm of assorted debris which rises from the seafloor and continues onshore. This subduction is also responsible for the volcanic interactions of southern Italy.

The Adriatic Sea, Istria, the eastern Italian Peninsula, Malta, and the coastal part of Slovenia are on the Adriatic/Apulian Plate. Mesozoic sedimentary rocks deposited on the plate include the limestones that form the Southern Calcareous Alps.

== See also ==
- Jabuka–Andrija Fault
