= List of mountain groups in the Alpine Club classification of the Eastern Alps =

This list of the mountain groups in the Eastern Alps shows all 75 mountain groups and chains in the Eastern Alps as per the Alpine Club classification of the Eastern Alps (AVE) of 1984.

The Alpine Clubs divide the Eastern Alps into four regions which, in turn, are subdivided into mountain groups. The four regions are the Northern, Central, Southern, and Western (Eastern) Alps. With 27 groups each the Northern and Central regions of the Eastern Alps form the greater part of the Eastern Alps. There are 15 groups in the Southern Eastern Alps and six in the Western Eastern Alps.

The Eastern Alps lie on the territories of six countries: Germany, Italy, Liechtenstein, Austria, Switzerland and Slovenia. Austria has the largest share with 57 mountain groups within its borders. It is followed by Italy with 23 and Switzerland with ten. There are 7 mountain groups In Germany and 4 in Slovenia. Liechtenstein share part of one group.

The only four-thousander and highest mountain of the Eastern Alps is the Piz Bernina at 4,049 m. The Bernina Group is thus the highest of all the Eastern Alpine groups. Next come the Ortler Alps with the Ortler (3,905 m) as the highest peak in South Tyrol. The third-highest group is the Glockner Group with the highest summit in Austria: the Großglockner (3,798 m). Another 22 groups reach a height of over 3,000 metres. The only group in the Northern Eastern Alps with a three thousander is the Lechtal Alps with its Parseierspitze (3,036 m). Another 39 groups are over 2,000 metres high. Several of the groups exceed 1,000 metres and only one lies below this level: the Vienna Woods. Its highest mountain, the Schöpfl, is only 893 m high.

== Legend ==
- AVE No.: the numbering of the group based on the Alpine Club classification (AVE). Numbers suffixed with lower case letters are groups that were further subdivided in 1984. These groups were part of a single unit before 1984.
- Name: name of the mountain group. Where names comprise two groups and where there are 2 articles in Wikipedia, both are shown.
- Map: Location map of the group in the Eastern Alps
- Location: the region within with the group falls
- Country: the country or countries within whose territory the mountain group lies. The country listed first is the one that contains the largest area of the mountain group.
- Highest mountain: name of the highest mountain in the group. If a group comprises two subgroups, the highest peak of both groups are named. The higher mountain is listed first.
- Height: height of the highest mountain in metres
- Image: image of the highest mountain

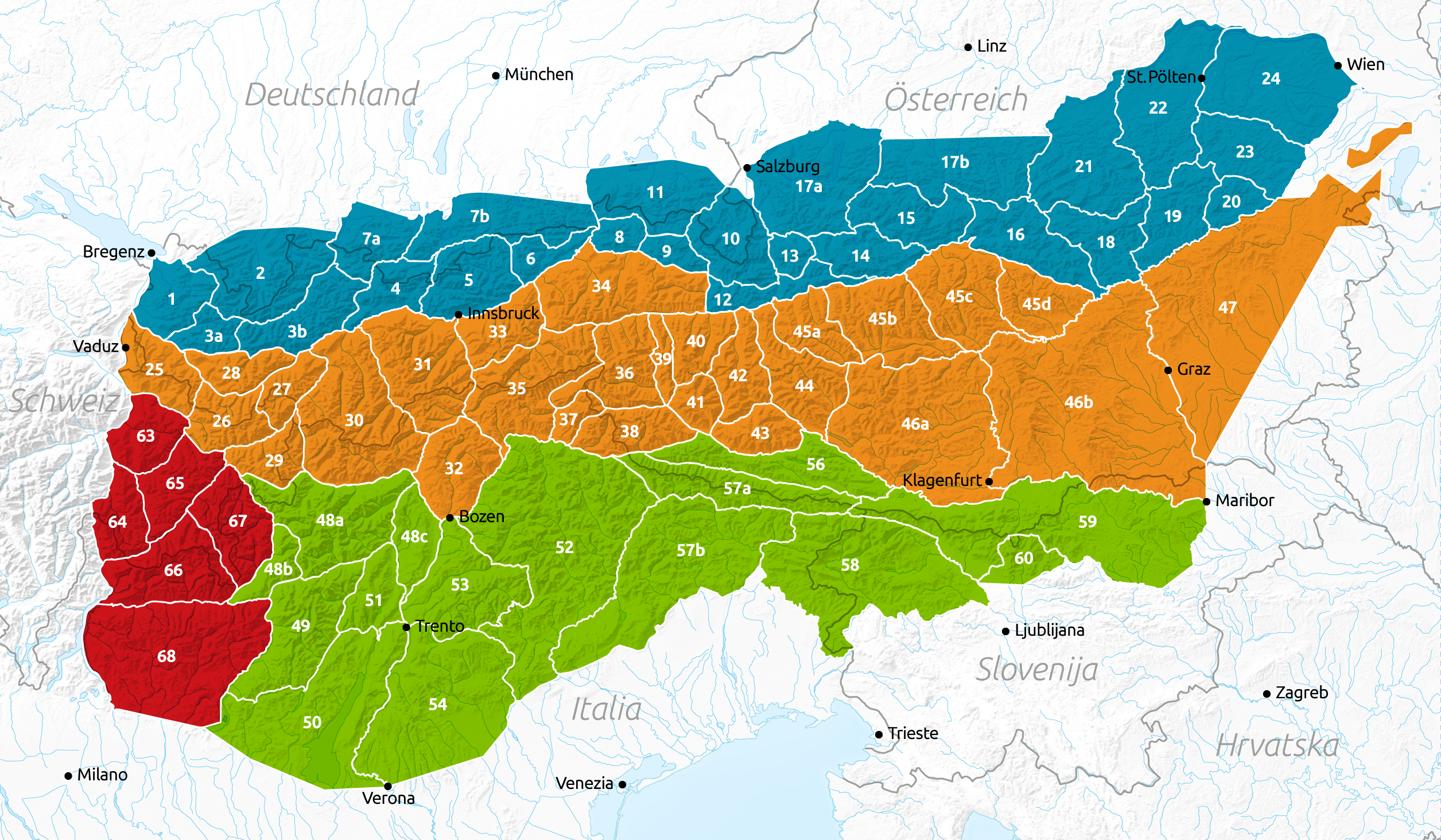
AVE classification of the Eastern Alps: Northern Limestone Alps Central Eastern Alps Southern Limestone Alps Western Limestone Alps.

== AVE 1984 ==
By clicking the symbol in the header of a given column, the table will be sorted by that column.

AVE- No.	Name	Map	Location	Country	Highest mountain	Height (m)	Image
1	Bregenz Forest Mountains		Northern Limestone Alps	Austria	Glatthorn	2,134	Glatthorn (2,134 m)
2	Allgäu Alps		Northern Limestone Alps	Germany; Austria	Großer Krottenkopf	2,656	Großer Krottenkopf (2,657 m)
3a	Lechquellen Mountains		Northern Limestone Alps	Austria	Große Wildgrubenspitze	2,753	Große Wildgrubenspitze (2,753 m)
3b	Lechtal Alps		Northern Limestone Alps	Austria	Parseierspitze	3,036	Parseierspitze (3,036 m)
4	Wetterstein and Mieminger Chain		Northern Limestone Alps	Austria; Germany	Zugspitze; Hochplattig	2,962; 2,768	Zugspitze (2,962 m)
5	Karwendel		Northern Limestone Alps	Austria; Germany	Birkkarspitze	2,749	Birkkarspitze (2,749 m)
6	Brandenberg Alps (Rofangebirge)		Northern Limestone Alps	Austria	Hochiss	2,299	Hochiss (2,299 m)
7a	Ammergau Alps		Northern Limestone Alps	Germany; Austria	Daniel	2,340	Daniel (2,340 m)
7b	Bavarian Prealps		Northern Limestone Alps	Germany; Austria	Krottenkopf	2,086	Krottenkopf (2,086 m)
8	Kaisergebirge		Northern Limestone Alps	Austria	Ellmauer Halt	2,344	Ellmauer Halt (2,344 m)
9	Leogang and Lofer Mountains		Northern Limestone Alps	Austria	Birnhorn; Großes Ochsenhorn	2,634; 2,511	Birnhorn (2,511 m)
10	Berchtesgaden Alps		Northern Limestone Alps	Austria; Germany	Hochkönig	2,941	Hochkönig (2,941 m)
11	Chiemgau Alps		Northern Limestone Alps	Germany; Austria	Sonntagshorn	1,961	Sonntagshorn (1,961 m)
12	Salzburg Slate Alps		Northern Limestone Alps	Austria	Hundstein	2,117	Hundstein (2,117 m)
13	Tennen Mountains		Northern Limestone Alps	Austria	Raucheck	2,430	The Tennen Mountains. Centre: the Raucheck (2,430 m)
14	Dachstein Mountains		Northern Limestone Alps	Austria	Hoher Dachstein	2,995	Aerial photograph of the Hoher Dachstein (2,995 m)
15	Totes Gebirge		Northern Limestone Alps	Austria	Großer Priel	2,515	Großer Priel (2,515 m)
16	Ennstal Alps		Northern Limestone Alps	Austria	Hochtor	2,369	Hochtor (2,369 m)
17a	Salzkammergut Mountains		Northern Limestone Alps	Austria	Gamsfeld	2,027	Gamsfeld (2,027 m)
17b	Upper Austrian Prealps		Northern Limestone Alps	Austria	Hoher Nock	1,963	Hoher Nock (1,963 m)
18	Hochschwab Group		Northern Limestone Alps	Austria	Hochschwab	2,277	Hochschwab (2,277 m)
19	Mürzsteg Alps		Northern Limestone Alps	Austria	Hohe Veitsch	1,981	Hohe Veitsch (1,981 m)
20	Rax-Schneeberg Group		Northern Limestone Alps	Austria	Klosterwappen	2,076	Schneeberg (2,076 m)
21	Ybbstal Alps		Northern Limestone Alps	Austria	Hochstadl	1,919	Hochstadl (1,919 m)
22	Türnitz Alps		Northern Limestone Alps	Austria	Großer Sulzberg	1,400	Großer Sulzberg (1,400 m)
23	Gutenstein Alps		Northern Limestone Alps	Austria	Reisalpe	1,399	Reisalpe (1,399 m)
24	Vienna Woods		Northern Limestone Alps	Austria	Schöpfl	893	Schöpfl (893 m)
25	Rätikon		Central Eastern Alps	Switzerland; Austria; Liechtenstein	Schesaplana	2,964	Schesaplana (2,964 m)
26	Silvretta		Central Eastern Alps	Switzerland; Austria	Piz Linard	3,411	Piz Linard (3,411 m)
27	Samnaun Alps		Central Eastern Alps	Austria; Switzerland	Muttler	3,294	The Muttler (left) and Stammerspitze (right)
28	Verwall		Central Eastern Alps	Austria	Hoher Riffler	3,168	Hoher Riffler (3,168 m)
29	Sesvenna Range		Central Eastern Alps	Switzerland; Italy; Austria	Piz Sesvenna	3,204	Piz Sesvenna (3,204 m)
30	Ötztal Alps		Central Eastern Alps	Austria; Italy	Wildspitze	3,768	Wildspitze (3,768 m)
31	Stubai Alps		Central Eastern Alps	Austria; Italy	Zuckerhütl	3,507	Zuckerhütl (3,507 m)
32	Sarntal Alps		Central Eastern Alps	Italy	Hirzer	2,781	Hirzer (2,781 m, left)
33	Tux Alps		Central Eastern Alps	Austria	Lizumer Reckner	2,884	Lizumer Reckner (2,884 m)
34	N Kitzbühel Alps		Central Eastern Alps	Austria	Kreuzjoch	2,558	Kreuzjoch (2,558 m)
35	Zillertal Alps		Central Eastern Alps	Austria	Hochfeiler	3,510	Hochfeiler (3,510 m)
36	Venediger Group		Central Eastern Alps	Austria	Grossvenediger Großvenediger	3,666	Großvenediger (3,666 m)
37	Rieserferner Group		Central Eastern Alps	Italy; Austria	Hochgall	3,436	Hochgall (3,436 m)
38	Villgraten Mountains		Central Eastern Alps	Austria; Italy	Weiße Spitze	2,962	Weiße Spitze (2,962 m, links)
39	Granatspitze Group		Central Eastern Alps	Austria	Großer Muntanitz	3,232	Großer Muntanitz (3,232 m)
40	Glockner Group		Central Eastern Alps	Austria	Großglockner	3,798	Großglockner (3,798 m)
41	Schober Group		Central Eastern Alps	Austria	Petzeck	3,283	Petzeck (3,283 m)
42	Goldberg Group		Central Eastern Alps	Austria	Hocharn	3,254	Hocharn (3,254 m)
43	Kreuzeck Group		Central Eastern Alps	Austria	Mölltaler Polinik	2,784	Mölltaler Polinik (2,784 m)
44	Ankogel Group		Central Eastern Alps	Austria	Hochalmspitze	3,360	Hochalmspitze (3,360 m)
45a	Radstadt Tauern		Central Eastern Alps	Austria	Weißeck	2,711	Weißeck (2,711 m)
45b	Schladming Tauern		Central Eastern Alps	Austria	Hochgolling	2,862	Hochgolling (2,862 m)
45c	Rottenmanner and Wölzer Tauern		Central Eastern Alps	Austria	Rettlkirchspitze	2,475	Rettlkirchspitze (2,475 m)
45d	Seckau Tauern		Central Eastern Alps	Austria	Geierhaupt	2,417	Geierhaupt (2,417 m)
46a	Gurktal Alps		Central Eastern Alps	Austria	Eisenhut	2,441	Schwarzsee with Eisenhut (2,441 m) in the background
46b	Lavanttal Alps		Central Eastern Alps	Austria; Slovenia	Zirbitzkogel	2,396	Zirbitzkogel (2,396 m)
47	Prealps East of the Mur		Central Eastern Alps	Austria	Stuhleck	1,782	Summit cross on the Stuhleck (1,782 m)
48a	Ortler Alps		Southern Limestone Alps	Italy; Switzerland	Ortler	3,905	Ortler (3,905 m)
48b	Sobretta-Gavia Group		Southern Limestone Alps	Italy	Monte Sobretta	3,296	Monte Sobretta (3,296 m)
48c	Nonsberg Group		Southern Limestone Alps	Italy	Laugenspitze	2,434	View from the Laugenspitze looking E
49	Adamello-Presanella Alps		Southern Limestone Alps	Italy	Presanella	3,556	Presanella (3,556 m)
50	Garda Mountains		Southern Limestone Alps	Italy	Monte Cadria	2,254	
51	Brenta Group		Southern Limestone Alps	Italy	Cima Tosa	3,173	Cima Tosa (3,173 m)
52	Dolomites		Southern Limestone Alps	Italy	Marmolada	3,343	Marmolada (3,343 m)
53	Fleimstal Alps		Southern Limestone Alps	Italy	Cima d’Asta	2,847	Cima d’Asta (2,847 m)
54	Vicentine Alps		Southern Limestone Alps	Italy	Cima Dodici	2,336	Cima Dodici (2,336 m)
55	until 1984: Bellunes Alps^{1}						
56	Gailtal Alps		Southern Limestone Alps	Austria	Große Sandspitze	2,770	Große Sandspitze (2,770 m)
57a	Carnic Main Crest		Southern Limestone Alps	Italy; Austria	Hohe Warte	2,780	Hohe Warte (2,780 m)
57b	Southern Carnic Alps		Southern Limestone Alps	Italy	Cima dei Preti	2,706	Cima dei Preti (2,706 m)
58	Julian Alps		Southern Limestone Alps	Slovenia; Italy	Triglav	2,864	Triglav (2,864 m)
59	Karawanks and Pohorje		Southern Limestone Alps	Austria; Slovenia; Italy	Hochstuhl; Črni Vrh	2,237; 1,543	Hochstuhl (2,237 m)
60	Stein Alps		Southern Limestone Alps	Slovenia; Austria	Grintovec	2,558	Grintovec (2,558 m)
61	Extra-Alpine regions in Austria^{2}						
62	Extra-Alpine regions in Germany^{2}						
63	Plessur Alps		Western Limestone Alps	Switzerland	Aroser Rothorn	2,980	Aroser Rothorn (2,980 m)
64	Oberhalbstein Alps		Western Limestone Alps	Switzerland; Italy	Piz Platta	3,392	Piz Platta (3,392 m)
65	Albula Alps		Western Limestone Alps	Switzerland	Piz Kesch	3,418	Piz Kesch (3,418 m)
66	Bernina Group		Western Limestone Alps	Italy; Switzerland	Piz Bernina	4,049	Piz Bernina (4,049 m)
67	Livigno Alps		Western Limestone Alps	Italy; Switzerland	Cima de’ Piazzi	3,439	Cima de’ Piazzi (3,439 m)
68	Bergamasque Alps		Western Limestone Alps	Italy	Pizzo di Coca	3,052	Pizzo di Coca (3,052 m)

- ^{1} In 1984, counted as part of the Dolomites (52) and the Southern Carnic Alps (57b).
- ^{2} Regions that do not describe the Eastern Alps. The AVE number was used by the German and Austrian Alpine Clubs in the sorting key of their hut guides.

== Literature ==
- Franz Graßler: Alpine Club classification of the Eastern Alps (AVE). In: DAV, OeAV, AVS (ed.): Berg '84. Alpine Club Yearbook, Vol. 108, 1984, pp. 215–224,
