= Alpine Club classification of the Eastern Alps =

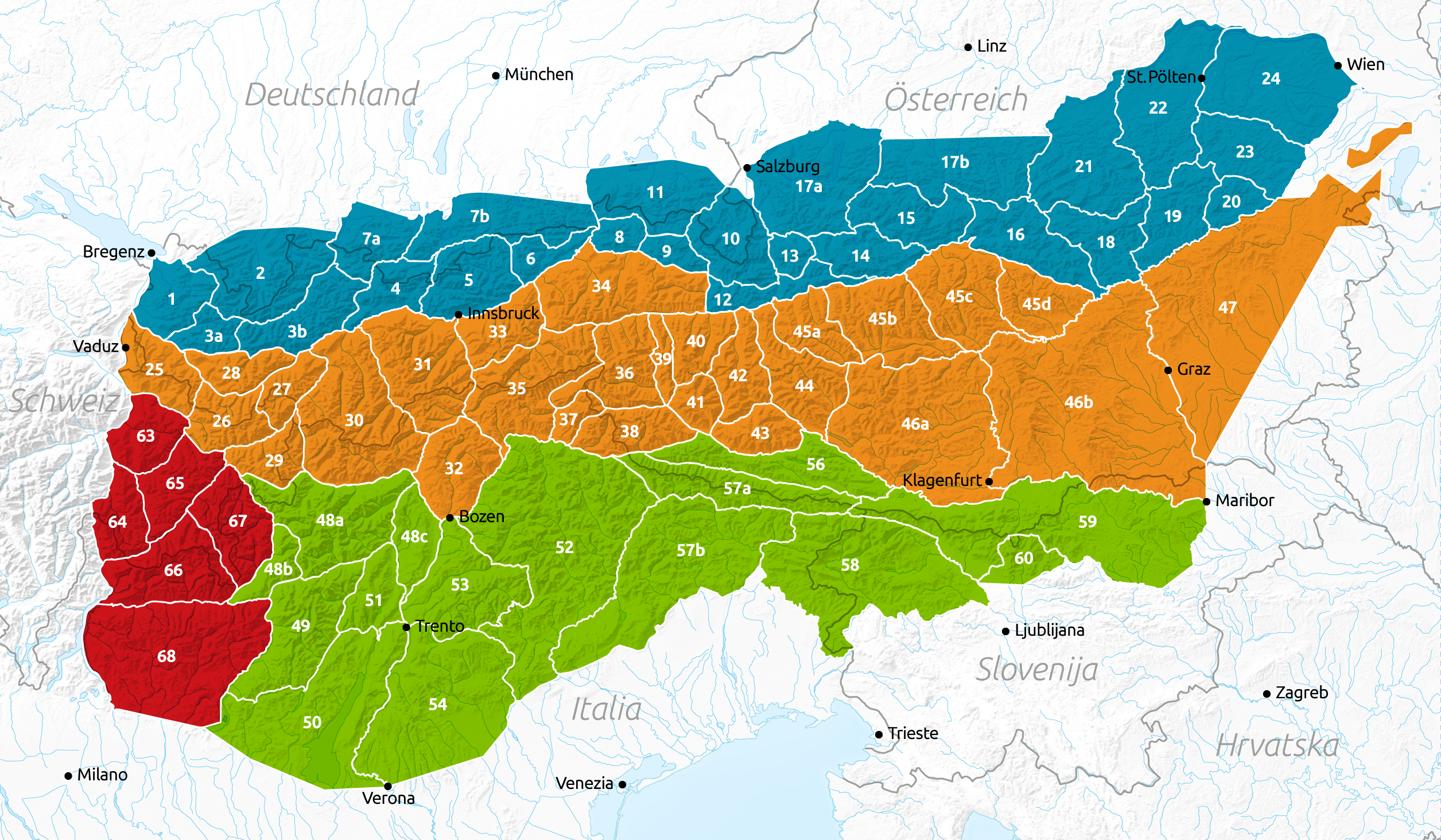
AVE classification of the Eastern Alps: Northern Limestone Alps Central Eastern Alps Southern Limestone Alps Western Limestone Alps For numbering see the list of mountain groups in the Alpine Club classification of the Eastern Alps

The Alpine Club classification of the Eastern Alps (German: Alpenvereinseinteilung der Ostalpen, AVE) is a common division of the Eastern Alps into 75 mountain ranges, based on the Moriggl Classification (ME) first published in 1924 by the German and Austrian Alpine Club. The present-day division established for the German-speaking world (less Switzerland) was compiled by the German, Austrian and South Tyrol Alpine Clubs and published in 1984 and is also used for the basic numbering of Alpine Club maps for mountaineering.

== Classification system ==
The Eastern Alps are divided into four main areas: the Northern Limestone Alps, the Central Eastern Alps, the Southern Limestone Alps, and the Western Limestone Alps. These four main ranges are further divided into 75 sub-groups. The Northern Limestone and Central Eastern Alps are the largest with 27 groups each, while the Southern Limestone Alps have 15. The six groups of the Western Limestone Alps are also classed with the Central Eastern Alps.

The classification is based principally on orographic considerations and takes into account the regional usage in terms of the names of the mountain groups. The amendments of 1984 address a number of geological problems and have dropped many of the 1924 Morrigl groups, making more precise sub-divisions for them in other areas. These changes are evident from the missing serial numbers and sub-division letters. The Western Limestone Alps were added, an area which is not covered by the three Alpine Clubs and actually is a continuation of the Southern and Swiss Alps. Unlike the previous scheme, the Salzburg Slate Alps were assigned to the Northern Limestone Alps as they are part of the greywacke zone that forms the basement of the Limestone Alps. The Ortler Alps and the Sobretta-Gavia range were grouped into the Southern Limestone Alps though, geologically, they are north of the Periadriatic Seam and ranked part of the Austroalpine nappes.

== Geographical characteristics ==
The Eastern Alps extend across six European countries: Germany, Italy, Liechtenstein, Austria, Switzerland and Slovenia. With 57 mountain groups, Austria has the largest share. It is followed by Italy with 23 and Switzerland with ten. There are seven mountain ranges in Germany and four in Slovenia. Liechtenstein shares one group.

The only four-thousander and the highest mountain in the Eastern Alps is the Piz Bernina at 4,046 m (13,274 ft). Thus the Bernina Range is the highest of all the groups in the Eastern Alps. Next are the Ortler Alps, whose highest peak, Mt. Ortler at 3,905 m (12,812 ft), is the highest mountain in South Tyrol. The third highest range is the Glockner Group with the highest mountain in Austria: the Grossglockner is 3,798 m (12,461 ft) high. Another 22 groups reach a height of 3,000 metres. The only group in the Northern Limestone Alps with a three-thousander is the Lechtal Alps, whose highest summit is the Parseierspitze at 3,036 m (9,961 ft). 39 groups are over 2000 metres high. Seven of the groups exceed 1000 metres—except for the Vienna Woods, whose highest mountain, the Schöpfl, just reaches an altitude of 893 m (2,930 ft).

== Mountain groups as per the Alpine Club classification ==
See List of mountain groups in the Alpine Club classification of the Eastern Alps

== Other classifications ==
Up to today, there is no internationally accepted classification of the Alps. Beside the common AVE arrangement, the Swiss Alpine Club subdivides the Swiss Alps (including the East Alpine parts) along cantonal boundaries, while Austrian hydrography uses a slightly different orographic system. In Italy and France the segmentation is usually based on the 1926 Partizione delle Alpi. In 2005, a new proposal was made by the Italian Alpinist, Sergio Marazzi, to merge the competing systems of the Alpine states into the Suddivisione Orografica Internazionale Unificata del Sistema Alpino (SOIUSA), but this has not gained a general acceptance.

== Sources ==
- Franz Graßler (1984), DAV; OeAV; AVS (eds.), "Alpenvereinseinteilung der Ostalpen (AVE) : Alpenvereins-Jahrbuch", Berg '84 (in German), vol. Band 108, pp. 215–224
- Dr. Josef Moriggl (1928), Hauptausschuß des D. u. Ö. Alpenvereins (ed.), Ratgeber für Alpenwanderer in den Ostalpen : Mit Schutzhüttenverzeichnis (in German) (2 ed.), Munich: Taschenbuch
