= Stol (Karawanks) =

Mountain in Slovenia and Austria

- Hochstuhl
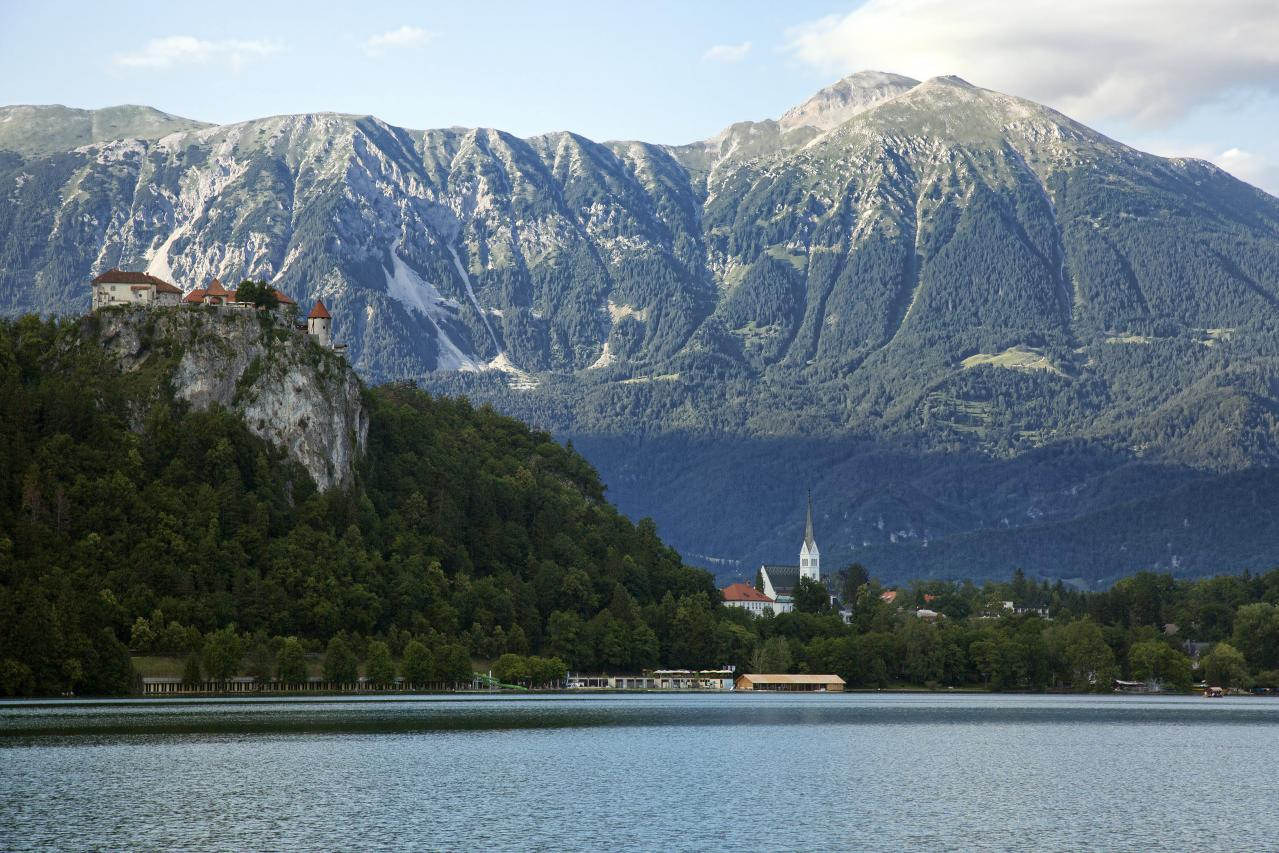
- Stol massif, view from Lake Bled

Highest point
- Elevation: 2,236 m (7,336 ft)
- Prominence: 1,021 m (3,350 ft)
- Coordinates: 46°26′2″N 14°10′26″E

Geography
- Location within Alps
- Location: Upper Carniola, Slovenia; Carinthia, Austria
- Parent range: Karawanks

Climbing
- First ascent: 1794

Stol (also Veliki Stol) or Hochstuhl, at 2,236 m (7,336 ft), is the highest mountain of the Karawanks and straddles the border between Slovenia and Austria.

== Etymology ==
The Slovene name Veliki Stol, meaning 'great chair', is derived from the visual appearance of the mountain, especially when seen from the east. The German Hochstuhl ('high chair') was not introduced until the late 19th century; previously, the mountain's German name was Stou, a phonetic derivation from the Slovene.

== Geography ==
The Stol massif stretches from Žirovnica in Slovenia to the Austrian market town of Feistritz im Rosental in the north. The summit is part of the Karawanks main ridge and the watershed between the Sava and Drava rivers. In the north, the Dachstein limestone rocks fall steeply to an over 500 m (1,600 ft) depth.

The massif comprises several subpeaks, such as Mali Stol ('Little Chair'), at 2,198 m (7,211 ft). In the east, the crest of the Karawanks leads to Mt. Vrtača and further down to Loibl Pass.

== Ascent ==
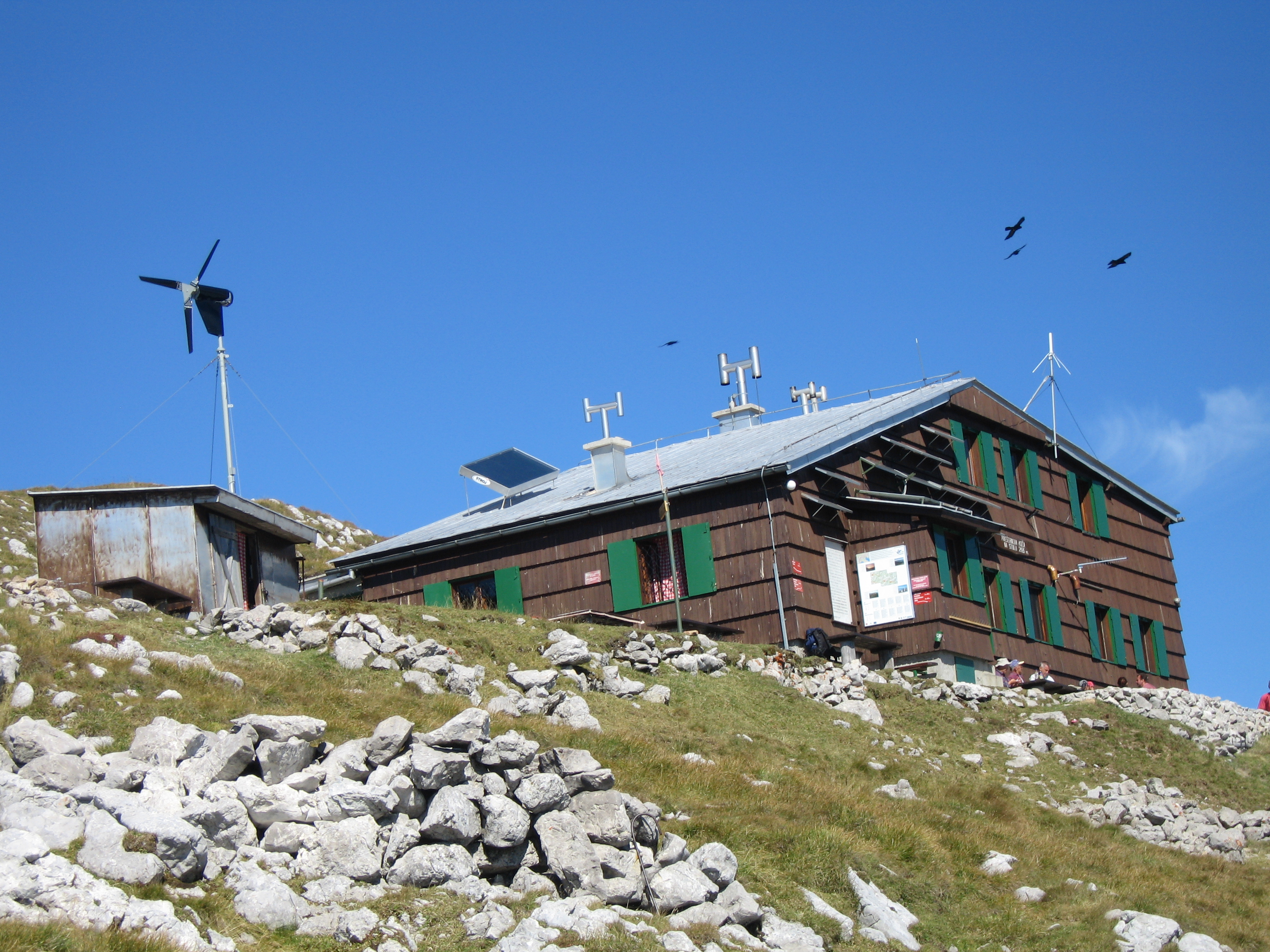
Prešeren Lodge

The first ascent of the mountain was made on 17 August 1794 by the Carniolan count and mountaineer Franz von Hohenwart (1771–1844) following an invitation from Sigmund Zois (1747–1819). On 9 September 1906 two climbers first reached the Stol peak via the steep north face. A first mountain hut south of the summit was erected by the Austrian Tourist Club in 1883 and called Valvasor Refuge. The Stou Refuge north of the main ridge was opened by the German and Austrian Alpine Club in 1886.

Today there are numerous routes to the summit from Feistritz on the Austrian side via the Klagenfurt Lodge (Klagenfurter Hütte), built in 1906, as well as routes from Žirovnica in Slovenia, where the Prešeren Lodge (Prešernova koča), opened in 1910, stands below the secondary peak of Mali Stol. Both refuges were burned down during World War II by Yugoslav partisans to prevent them from being used as base camps by Wehrmacht soldiers. The Klagenfurt Lodge re-opened in 1952 with 24 berths and a dormitory (Matratzenlager); the Prešeren Lodge was rebuilt in 1966, it is nowadays open from mid-June to mid-September. It has 45 berths, a washroom, and two dining rooms with a seating capacity of 80.

The ascent of the 500 m steep slope on the north face of the mountain is climbed by a via ferrata (Klettersteig) built by the Austrian Alpine Club in 1966/67, the use of which requires some mountaineering skills.

== Gallery ==
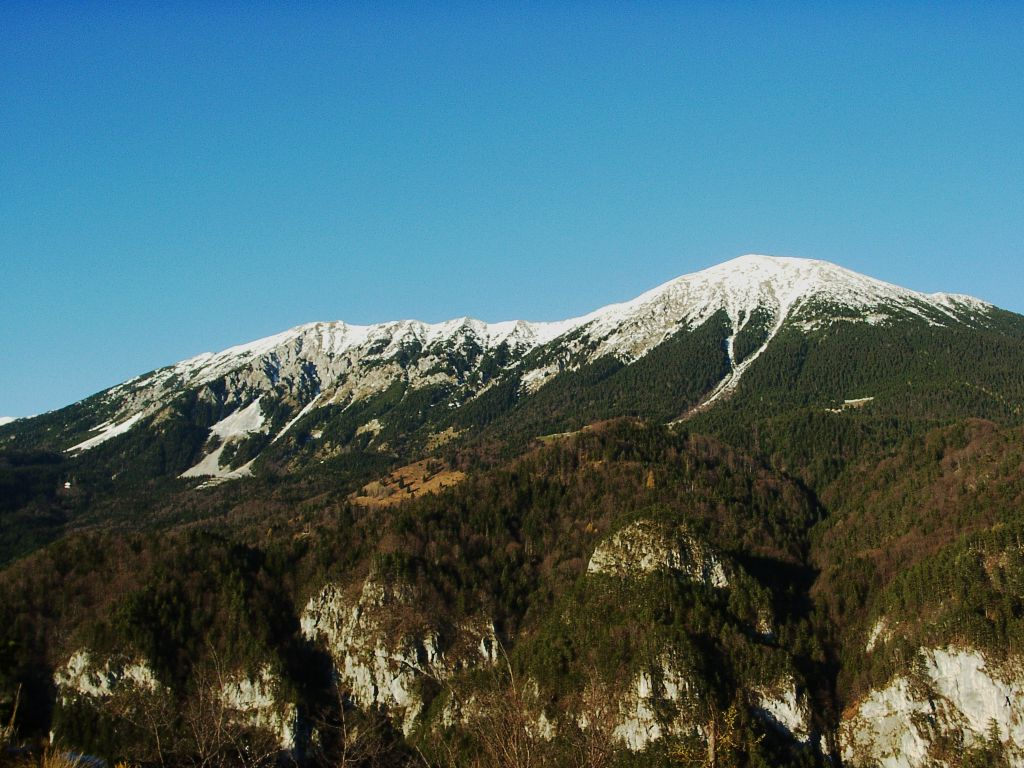
Stol

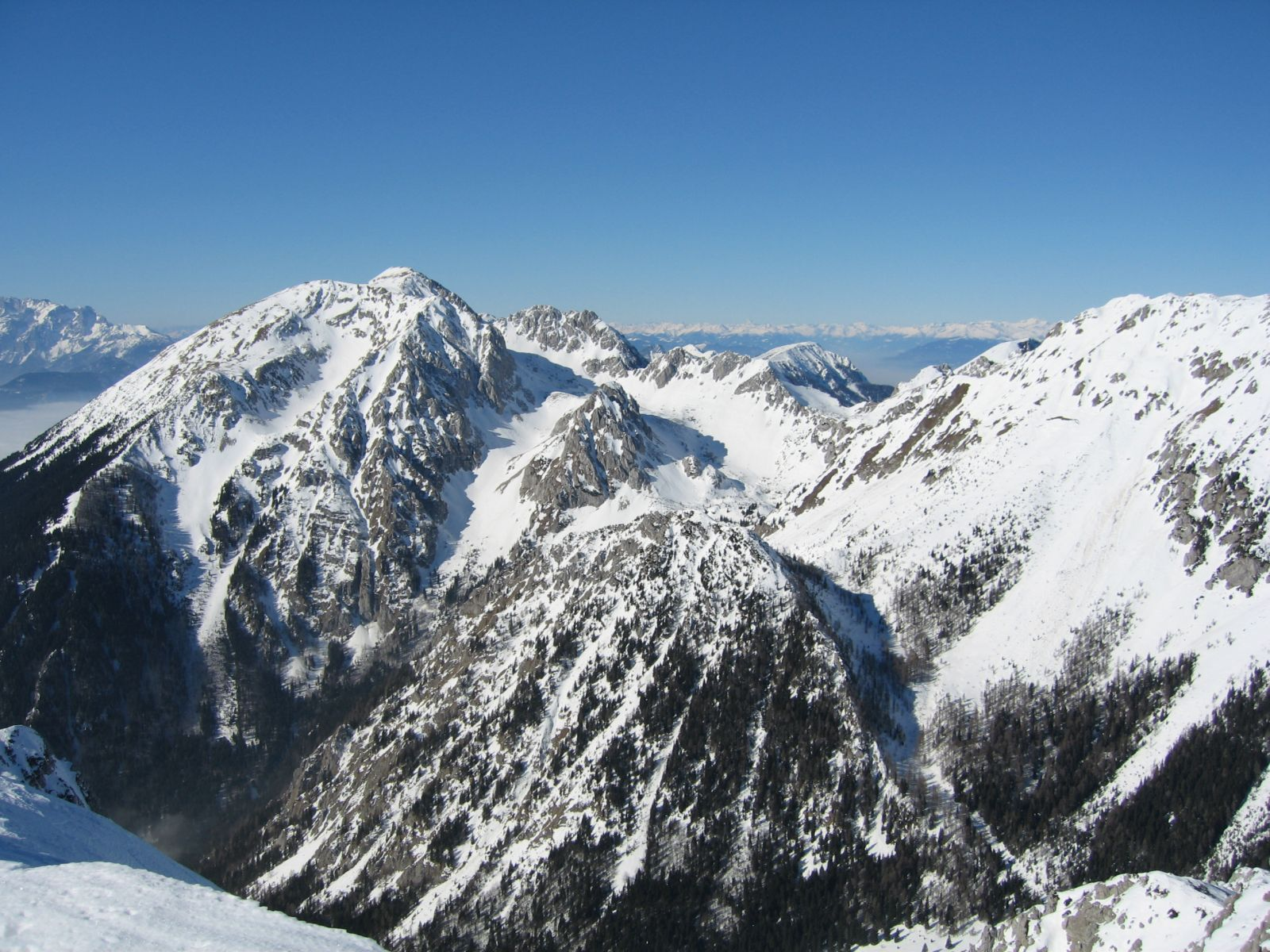
Stol from Begunjščica

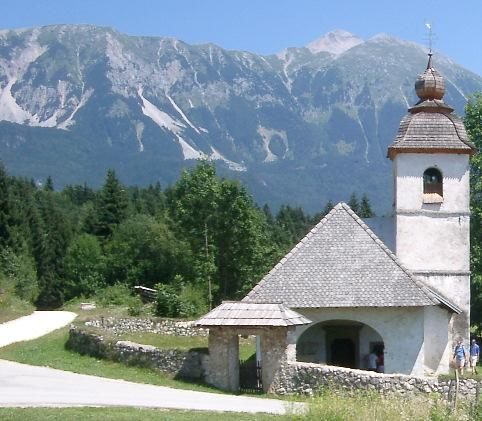

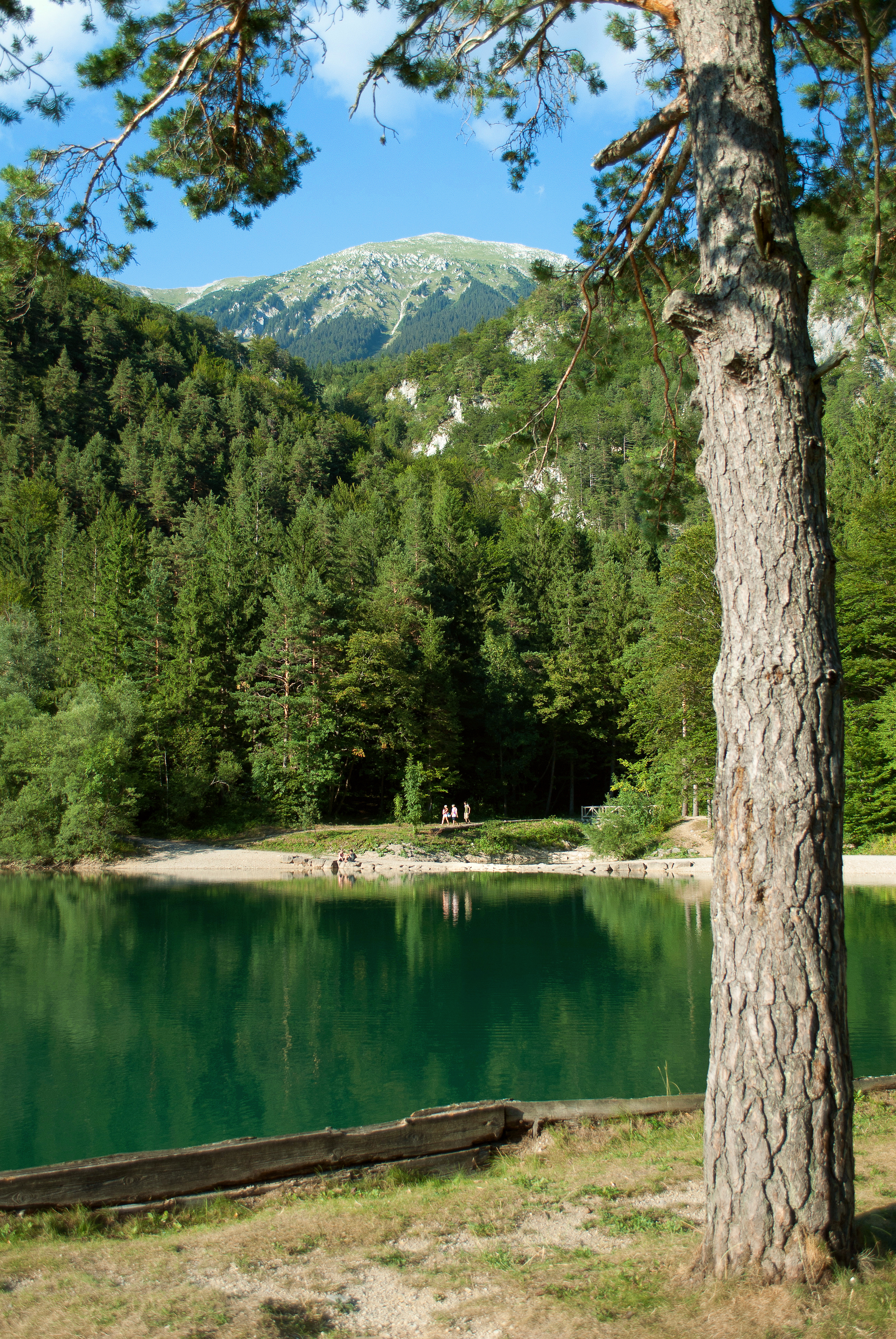
