= List of alpine clubs =

Outdoor social clubs

Alpine clubs are typically large social clubs that revolve around climbing, hiking, and other outdoor activities. Many alpine clubs also take on aspects typically reserved for local sport associations, providing education and training courses, services for outdoorsmen, and de facto regulation of local mountaineering resources and behavior of mountaineers. Most clubs organize social events, schedule outings, and stage climbing competitions, operate alpine huts and paths, and are active in protecting the alpine environment.

The first alpine club, the Alpine Club, based in the United Kingdom, was founded in London in 1857 as a gentlemen's club. It was once described as:

"a club of English gentlemen devoted to mountaineering, first of all in the Alps, members of which have successfully addressed themselves to attempts of the kind on loftier mountains" (Nuttall Encyclopaedia, 1907).

With around 1,500,000 members the German Alpine Club is usually reckoned as the largest alpine club in the world.

== List of Alpine clubs ==
| Club | Abbreviation | Country | Founded |
|---|---|---|---|
| Centre Excursionista de Catalunya. Hiking Club of Catalonia | CEC | Catalonia (Spain) | 1876 |
| Alpine Club of Pakistan | ACP | Pakistan | 1974 |
| Alpine Club Prishtina | KAP | Kosovo | 2013 |
| Clube Alpino Paulista | CAP | Brazil | 1959 |
| Academic Alpine Club of Innsbruck | AAKI | Austria | 1893 |
| Academic Alpine Association of Innsbruck | AAVI | Austria | 1900 |
| Academic Alpine Club of Munich | AAVM | Germany | 1892 |
| South Tyrol Alpine Club | AVS | Italy | 1946 (1869-1923: part of OeAV, banned after 1923) |
| Alpine Club | AC | United Kingdom | 1857/58 |
| Alpine Club of Canada | ACC | Canada | 1906 |
| Alpine Club of Haller | AGH | Austria | 1905 |
| Alpine Club of Krummholz | AGK | Austria | 1879 |
| Alpine Club of Peilsteiner | AG? | Austria | 1894 |
| Alpine Club of Preintaler | AGP | Austria | 1885 |
| Alpine Club of Reißtaler | AGR | Austria | 1881 |
| Alpine Association of Berne | AVB | Switzerland | 1909 |
| American Alpine Club | AAC | United States | 1902 |
| Alpine Club at CU | CUAC | United States | 2001 |
| Andean German Club | DAV Santiago | Chile | 1924 |
| Appalachian Mountain Club | AMC | United States | 1876 |
| Armenian Mountaineering and Hiking Federation | AMHF | Armenia | 2011 |
| Associazione Sentieri Alpini Calanca | ASAC | Switzerland | 1978 |
| Australian Alpine Club | AAC | Australia | 1950 |
| Barts and the London Alpine Club | BLAC | United Kingdom | 1941 |
| Bangladesh Mountaineering Federation | BMF | Bangladesh | 2000 |
| Belgian Alpine Club | BAC CAB | Belgium | 1883 |
| Bihari Kárpát Egyesület | BKE | Hungary | 1888 |
| California Alpine Club | CAC | United States | 1913 |
| Carpathian Association of Hungary (Magyarországi Kárpát Egyesület) | MKE | Kingdom of Hungary | 1873 |
| Club Alpin Monégasque | CAM | Monaco | 1911 |
| Federation Française des Clubs Alpins et de Montagne | FFCAM | France | 1874 |
| Club Alpino Italiano | CAI | Italy | 1863 |
| Clubul Alpin Român | CAR | Romania | 1934 |
| Club Andino Bariloche | CAB | Argentina | 1931 |
| Colorado Mountain Club | CMC | United States | 1912 |
| Crimean-Caucasian Mountaineering Club | CCMC | Russia | 1890 |
| Croatian Mountaineering Association (Hrvatski planinarski savez) | HPS (HPD) | Croatia | 1874 |
| Delftsche Studenten Alpen Club | DSC | Netherland | 1922 |
| Den Norske Turistforening | DNT | Norway | 1886 |
| Excelsior Alpine Club | Excelsior | Hungary | 1966 |
| German Alpine Club (Deutscher Alpenverein) | DAV | Germany | 1869 |
| German Hiking Club of Valparaiso | DAV | Chile | 1909 |
| Kiama Alpine Club | KAC | Australia | 1957 |
| Kiandra Pioneer Ski Club | KPSC | Australia | 1861 |
| Kosciusko Alpine Club | KAC | Australia | 1909 |
| Federación Española de Deportes de Montaña y Escalada | FEDME | Spain | 1922 |
| Fédération des Clubs Alpins Académiques de Suisse; Association of Academic Alpine Clubs of Switzerland: Academic Alpine Club of Basle AACBS 1918; Academic Alpine Club of Berne AACB 1905; Academic Alpine Club of Zürich AACZ 1896; Club Alpin Académique Genève CAAG 1927 | FCAAS | Switzerland | 1983 |
| Fédération française de la montagne et de l’escalade | FFME | France | 1942 |
| Federazione alpinistica ticinese | FAT | Switzerland | 1965 |
| Groupe Alpin Luxembourgeois | GAL | Luxembourg | 1955 |
| Groupe de Haute Montagne | GHM | France | 1919 |
| Climbing Interest Group (Interessengemeinschaft Klettern) | IG Klettern | Germany | 1989 |
| Icelandic Alpine Club | ÍSALP | Iceland | 1977 |
| Japanese Alpine Club | JAC | Japan | 1905 |
| Ladies' Alpine Club | LAC | United Kingdom | 1907 to 1975 Merged with AC |
| Liechtenstein Alpine Club | LAV | Liechtenstein | 1946 (1909 DuÖAV branch) |
| Austrian Friends of Nature (Naturfreunde Österreich) | NFÖ, TVN | Austria | 1895 |
| Nederlandse Klim- en Bergsport Vereniging | NKBV | Netherlands | 1902/1998 |
| New Zealand Alpine Club | NZAC | New Zealand | 1891 |
| Österreichische Bergsteigervereinigung | ÖBV | Austria | 1907 |
| Austrian Alpine Club (Österreichischer Alpenklub) | ÖAK | Austria | 1878 |
| Austrian Alpine Club (Österreichischer Alpenverein) | OeAV | Austria | 1862 |
| Austrian Tourist Club (Österreichischer Touristenklub) | ÖTK | Austria | 1869 |
| Austrian Tourist Association (Österreichischer Touristenverein) | ÖTV | Austria | 1908 |
| Alpine Association of Slovenia (Planinska zveza Slovenije) | PZS | Slovenia | 1893 |
| Ljubljana Matica Alpine Club (Planinsko društvo Ljubljana-Matica) | PD LM | Slovenia | 1945 |
| Polski Związek Alpinizmu | PZA | Poland | 1974 |
| Rendez-vous Hautes Montagnes | RHM | Europe | 1968 |
| Swiss Alpine Club | SAC CAS | Switzerland | 1863 |
| Skagit Alpine Club | SAC | United States | 1960 |
| Swiss Ladies' Alpine Club | SFAC | Switzerland | 1918 to 1979 Merged with SAC |
| Magyarországi Kárpátegylet | MKE | Hungary | 1873 |
| Siebenbürgischer Karpatenverein | SKV | Hungary | 1880 |
| Società Alpinistica Ticinese | SAT | Switzerland | 1937 |
| Società Escursionistica Verzaschese | SEV | Switzerland | 1983 |
| Société des Touristes du Dauphiné | STD | France | 1875 |
| Southern Alps Ski Club | SASC | Australia | 1935 |
| Svenska Turistföreningen | STF | Sweden | 1885 |
| Türkiye Dağcılık Federasyonu | TDF | Turkey | 1936 (predecessor 1928) |
| Unione Ticinese Operai Esccursionisti | UTOE | Switzerland | 1919 |
| Israel Climbers Club | ICC | Israel | 1939 |
| Mazamas | MAZ | United States | 1894 |
| Damavand mountaineering and ski club | DMSC | Iran | 1953 |
| The Mountaineers | | United States | 1906 |
| Washington Alpine Club | WAC | United States | 1916 |
| Centro Excursionista Brasileiro | CEB | Brazil | 1919 |
| Círculo Marumbinista de Curitiba | CMC | Brazil | 1930 |
