= Southern Limestone Alps =

Portion of the Eastern Alps mountain range

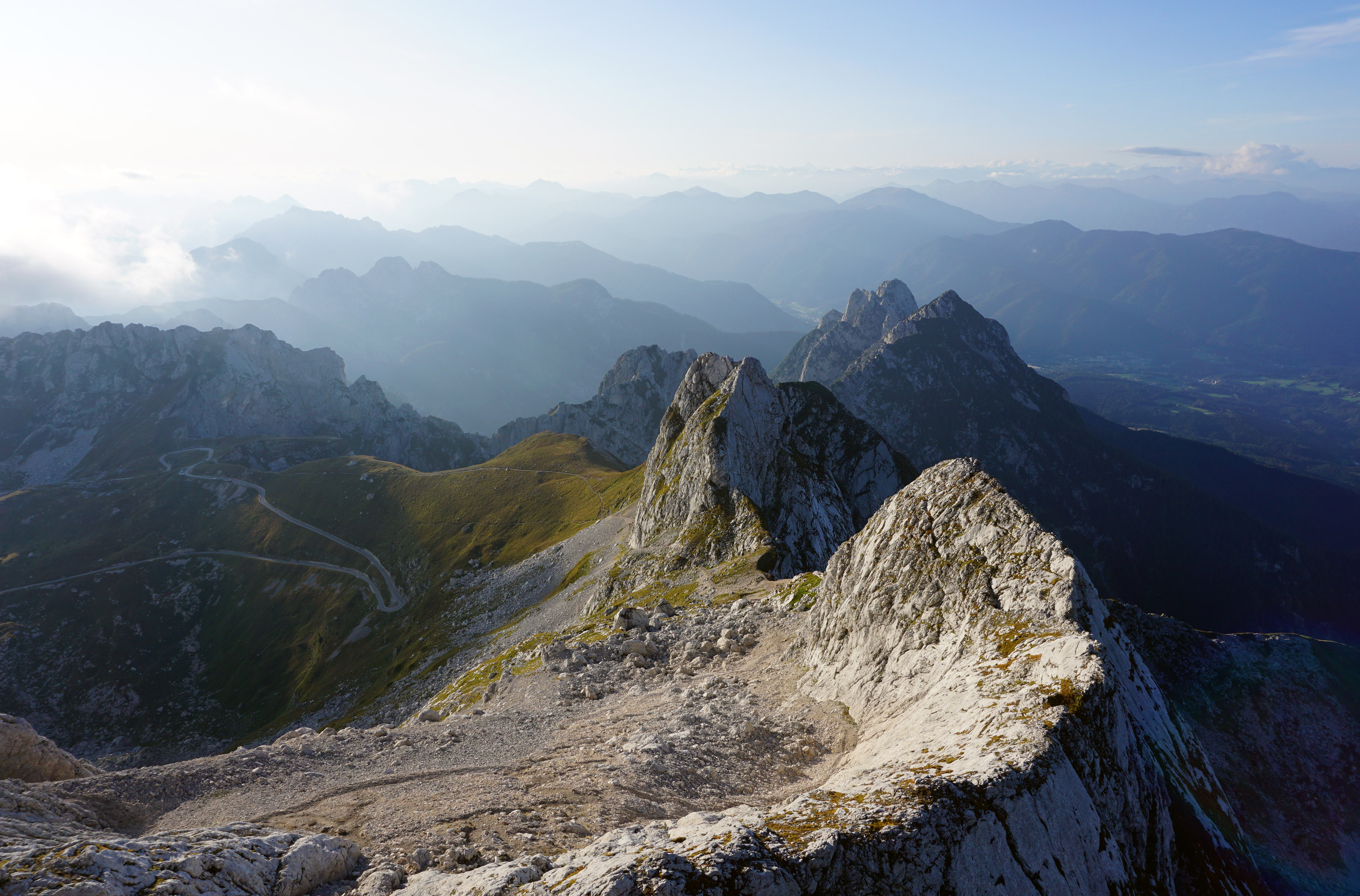
- Julian Alps: Mangart Pass

Highest point
- Peak: Ortler
- Elevation: 3,905 m (12,812 ft)
- Coordinates: 46°30′32″N 10°32′42″E

Geography
- Countries: Austria; Slovenia; Italy; Switzerland
- States: Carinthia; East Tyrol; Friuli-Venezia Giulia; Veneto; Trentino-Alto Adige/Südtirol; Lombardy
- Parent range: Eastern Alps

Geology
- Rock ages: Mesozoic; Tertiary
- Rock types: Limestone; dolomite

The Southern Limestone Alps (Italian: Alpi Sud-orientali, German: Südliche Kalkalpen), also called the Southern Calcareous Alps, are the ranges of the Eastern Alps south of the Central Eastern Alps mainly located in northern Italy and the adjacent lands of Austria and Slovenia. The distinction from the Central Alps, where the higher peaks are located, is based on differences in geological composition. The Southern Limestone Alps extend from the Sobretta-Gavia range in Lombardy in the west to the Pohorje in Slovenia in the east.

== Alpine Club classification ==
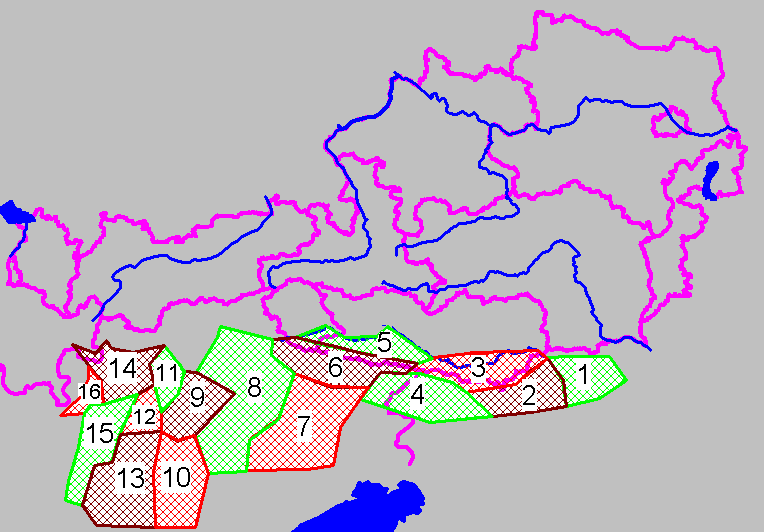
Groups of the Southern Limestone Alps (purple lines showing international borders and the borders of Austrian states)

Ranges of the Southern Limestone Alps according to the Alpine Club classification (from east to west):

- Pohorje (1)
- Kamnik–Savinja Alps (2)
- Karawanks (3)
- Julian Alps (4)
- Gailtal Alps (5)
- Carnic Alps (6)
- Southern Carnic Alps (7)
- Dolomites (8)
- Fiemme Mountains (9)
- Vicentine Alps (10)
- Nonsberg Group (11)
- Brenta Group (12)
- Garda Mountains (13)
- Ortler Alps (14)
- Adamello-Presanella Alps (15)
- Sobretta-Gavia Group (16)

== Physiography ==
The Southern Alps are a distinct physiographic section of the larger Alps province, which in turn is part of the larger Alpine System physiographic division.

== See also ==
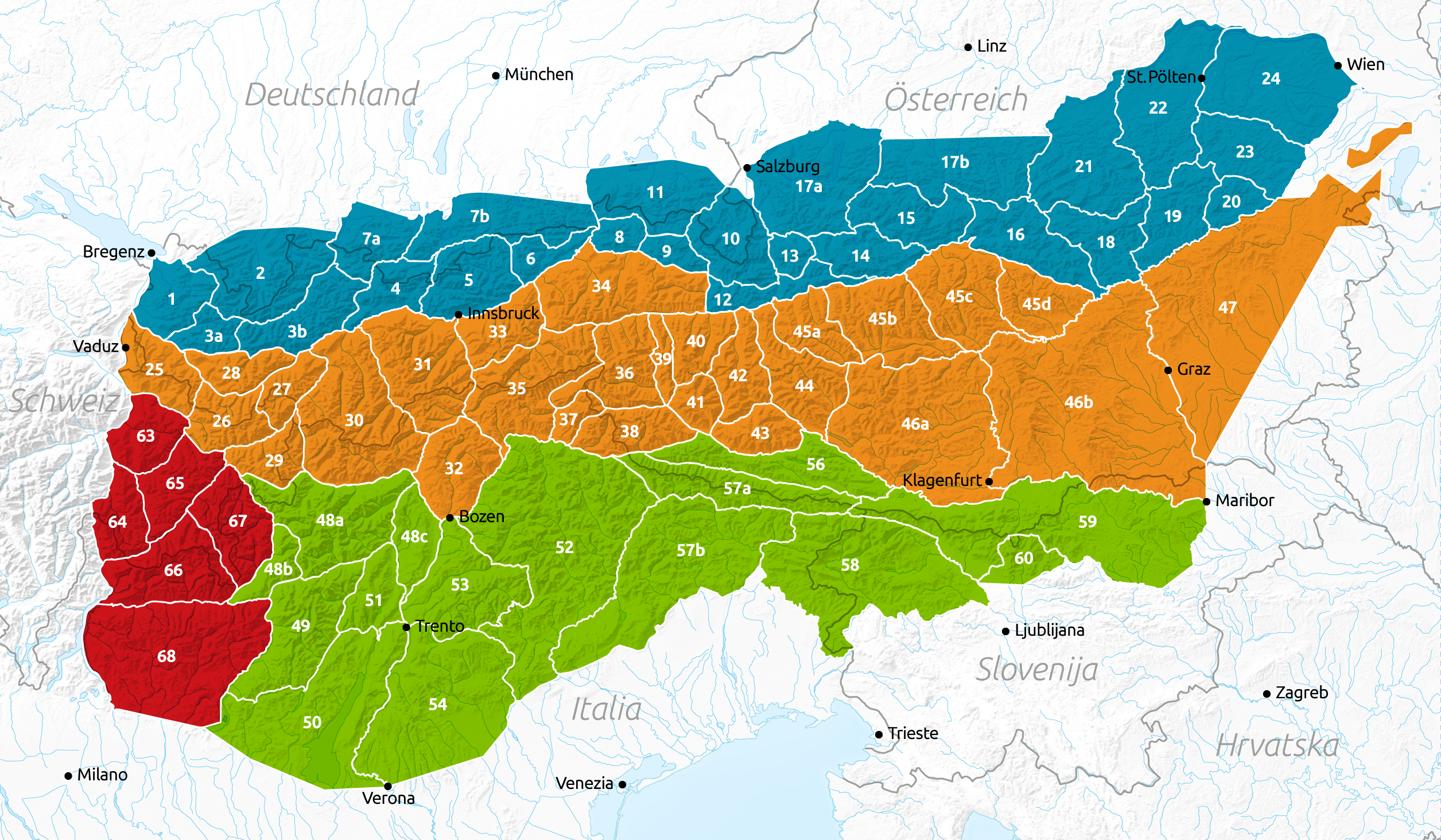
AVE classification: Northern Limestone Alps Central Eastern Alps Southern Limestone Alps Western Limestone Alps

- Geography of the Alps
- Limestone Alps
- Northern Limestone Alps
- List of mountain groups in the Alpine Club classification of the Eastern Alps
