= Rhaetian Alps =

Mountain range of the Eastern Alps

Coordinates: 46°48′N 10°00′E

The Rhaetian Alps (Italian: Alpi Retiche; German: Rätische Alpen) are a mountain range of the Eastern Alps. The SOIUSA classification system divides them into the Western, Southern Rhaetian Alps and Eastern Rhaetian Alps, while the Alpine Club classification of the Eastern Alps places most of the Rhaetian subranges within the Western Limestone Alps.

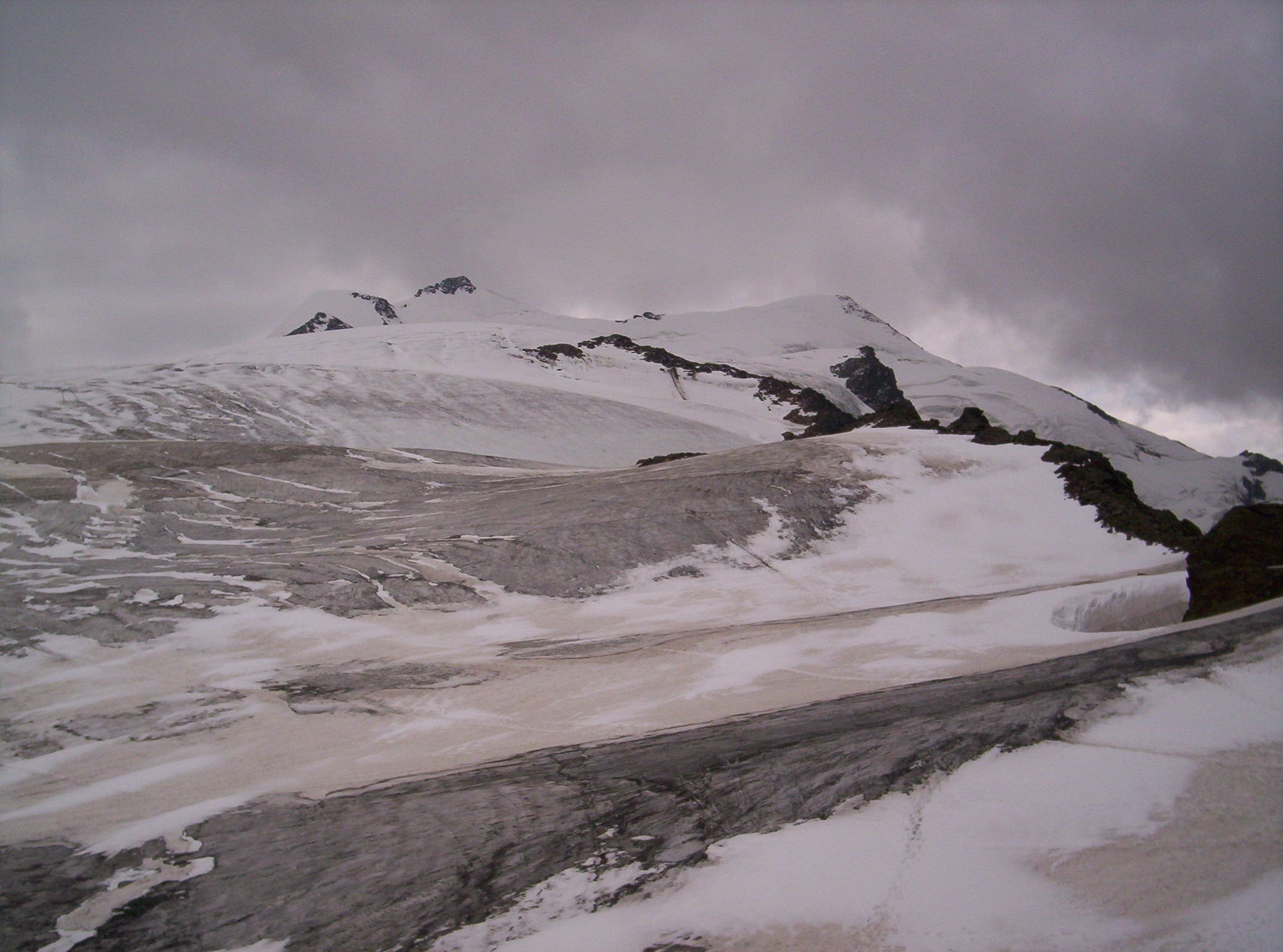
Monte Cevedale 12,365 feet (3,769 m) of the Ortler Alps, a Rhaetian Alps subrange in Italy.

They are located along the Italian–Swiss and Austrian–Swiss borders, in the canton of Graubünden in eastern Switzerland; in the state of Tyrol in Austria; and in the Italian regions of Trentino-Alto Adige and Lombardy.

The name relates to a Roman province and the Rhaetian people subdued under Emperor Augustus in 15 BC.

== Geography ==
The Rhaetian Alps contain multiple subranges including:

1. Albula Range (Western)
2. Bernina Range (Western)
3. Brenta group (Southern)
4. Ortler Alps (Southern)
5. Rätikon (Western)
6. Silvretta (Western)

The Swiss National Park is located in the Western Rhaetian Alps.

=== Peaks ===
The highest peak in the range is Piz Bernina at 4,049 metres (13,284 ft), located in Grisons/Graubünden canton, Switzerland, adjacent to the Italian border.

The main peaks of the Rhaetian Alps are:

Peak	Elevation	
Peak	(m)	(ft)
Piz Bernina	4,049	13,284
Punta di Ercavallo	3,068	10,066

== See also ==
- Limestone Alps
- Southern Limestone Alps
- Central Eastern Alps
- The Rhaetian Age which ends the Triassic Period of geological time is named after the Rhaetian Alps.
