= Limestone Alps =

Mountain range in the Alps

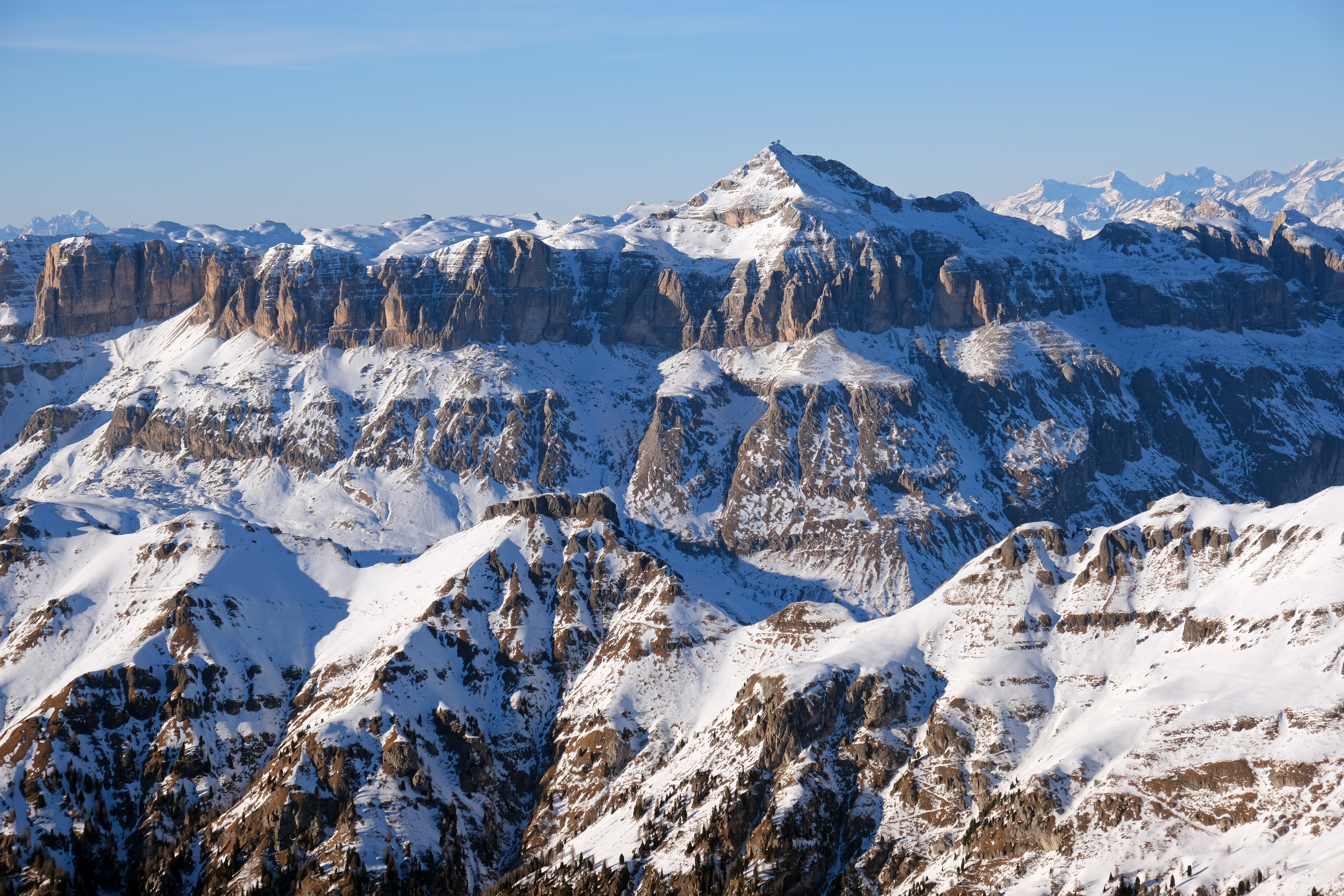
Piz Boè, the Dolomites

The Limestone Alps (German: Kalkalpen) are sub-mountain range of the Alps in Central Europe.

They are of economic importance, including as a watershed source of drinking water. They have many accessible dripstone and ice caves.

== Geography ==
They are roughly 600 kilometres (370 mi) long. The two main groups, Northern and Southern, run parallel to the main Austrian Central Alps (also known as the Central Eastern Alps) mountain ranges, on their north and south. Together with the Austrian Central Alps, the Limestone Alps form the most westerly portion of the Eastern Alps.

The mountain and hill profiles of the Limestone Alps are very varied and range from jagged peaks and sheer rock faces to high plateaus and extensive areas of karst formations.

=== Groups ===
The numerous ranges of the Limestone Alps are within three mountain groupings, the Northern Limestone Alps, Southern Limestone Alps, and Western Limestone Alps:

- The Northern Limestone Alps are in Austria and Bavaria, Germany. Its ranges include: the Allgäu Alps, Berchtesgaden Alps, Chiemgau Alps, Ennstal Alps, Salzburg Slate Alps, Türnitz Alps, Vienna Woods foothills, Ybbstal Alps
- The Southern Limestone Alps are in Austria, northern Italy, Slovenia, and Switzerland. Its ranges include: the Dolomites, Carnic Alps, Julian Alps, Ortler Alps, and Vicentine Alps.
- The Western Limestone Alps are in Austria, Italy and Switzerland. Its ranges include: the Albula Alps, Bergamasque Alps, Livigno Alps, Oberhalbstein Alps, Plessur Alps and Rhaetian Alps.

The Limestone Alps comprise 3 of the 4 primary regions in the Alpine Club classification of the Eastern Alps. However, they are not used in the proposed SOIUSA classification system.

== Geology ==
The Limestone Alps are made of lighter and more porous rock than the rest of the Alps. In addition to limestone, they also contain dolomite, marl, and sandstone. They are unlike the Central Alps, which are mainly composed of crystalline rock (granite and gneiss), or of slate.

== See also ==
- Mountain ranges of the Alps
- Limestone Alps National Park
- List of mountain groups in the Alpine Club classification of the Eastern Alps
- SOIUSA proposed classification system
