= Alpine Club Museum =

Museum in Austria

Coordinates: 47°16′8.1″N 11°23′41.8″E

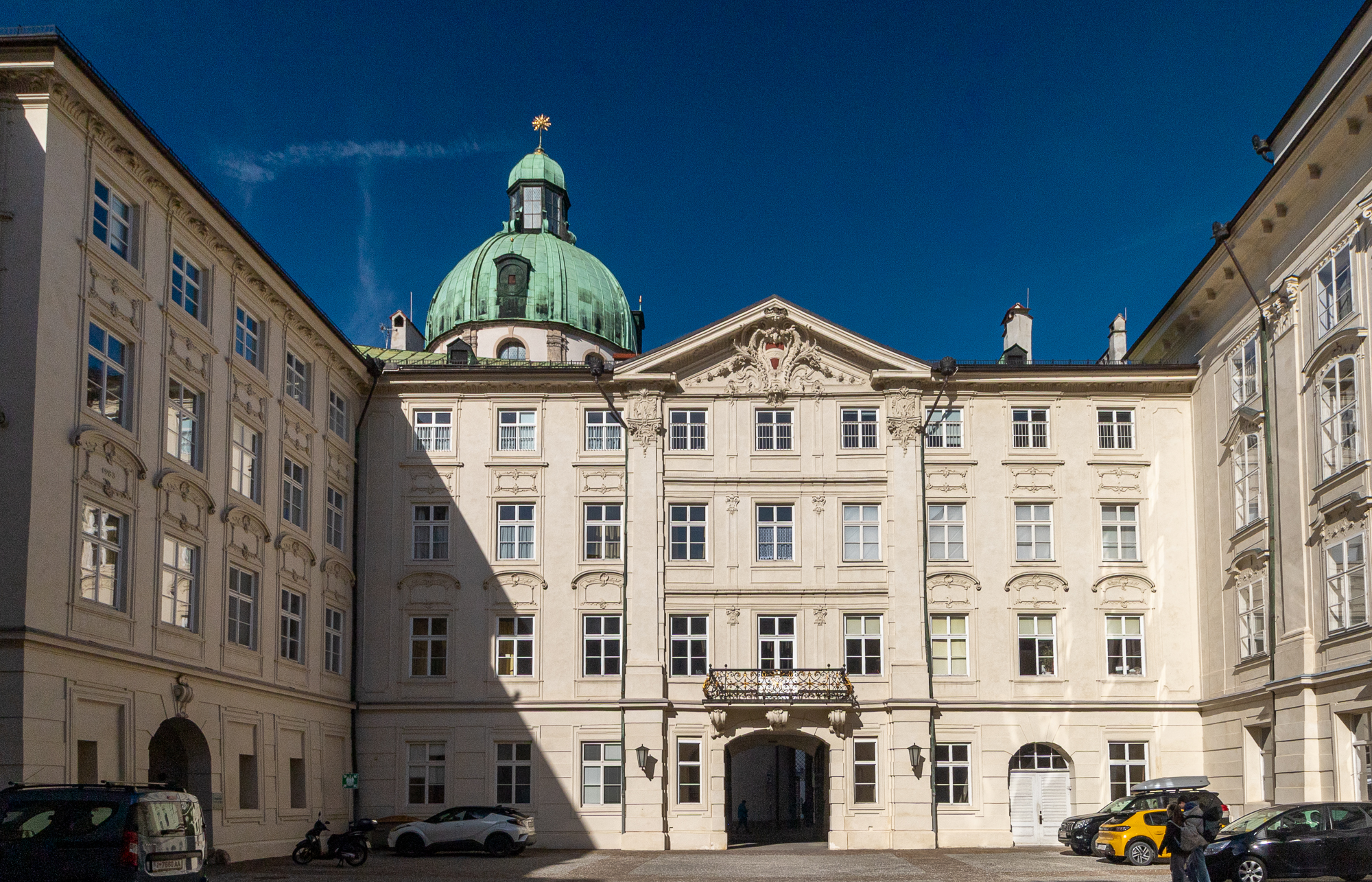
Imperial Hofburg in Innsbruck, which houses the Alpine Club Museum

The Alpine Club Museum (German: Alpenverein-Museum) in Innsbruck, Austria, is a museum dedicated to the history of alpinism. Located in the Hofburg in the Altstadt section of the city, the museum is owned by the Austrian Alpine Club (ÖAV). In 2009, the museum was assessed as "excellent" for the Tyrolean and Austrian Museum Prizes, and was also nominated for the European Museum Prize in 2010.

== History ==
The Alpine Club Museum was opened in 1911 in a former villa on the River Isar in Munich as the "Alpine Museum", following a key resolution by the German and Austrian Alpine Club in 1907. In 1944 it was destroyed by shelling, but the majority of the collection had already been moved to Tyrol in Austria. It was not until 1973, however, that the ÖAV had a part of the collection displayed in the Palace of Thurn and Taxis in Maria Theresia Straße. From 1977 the museum was located on the third floor of the newly built Alpine Club house in Wilhelm Greil Straße. In 1993 the exhibition floor was changed structurally and in 1996 they began to produce their own exhibitions. In 2002, the "Year of the Mountains", an exhibition was displayed for the first time in the public arena ("Vertical - The Innsbruck Northern Mountain Chain. An Exhibition in the City"). After the Alpine Club had moved to a new building in 2008 the old exhibition area was no longer available and a cooperative agreement was reached with the Hofburg whereby the permanent exhibition, "Mountains - an Incomprehensible Passion" ("Berge, eine unverständliche Leidenschaft"), would be displayed on an area of 700 m^{2} (7,500 sq ft) on the first floor until 2012.

== See also ==
- Messner Mountain Museum
- Swiss Alpine Museum

== Sources and Literature ==
- AV-Jahrbuch Berg 2011
- Bergauf 01/2011; pages 3, 5–8, 14–17
