= German and Austrian Alpine Club =

Defunct German/Austrian climbing organization

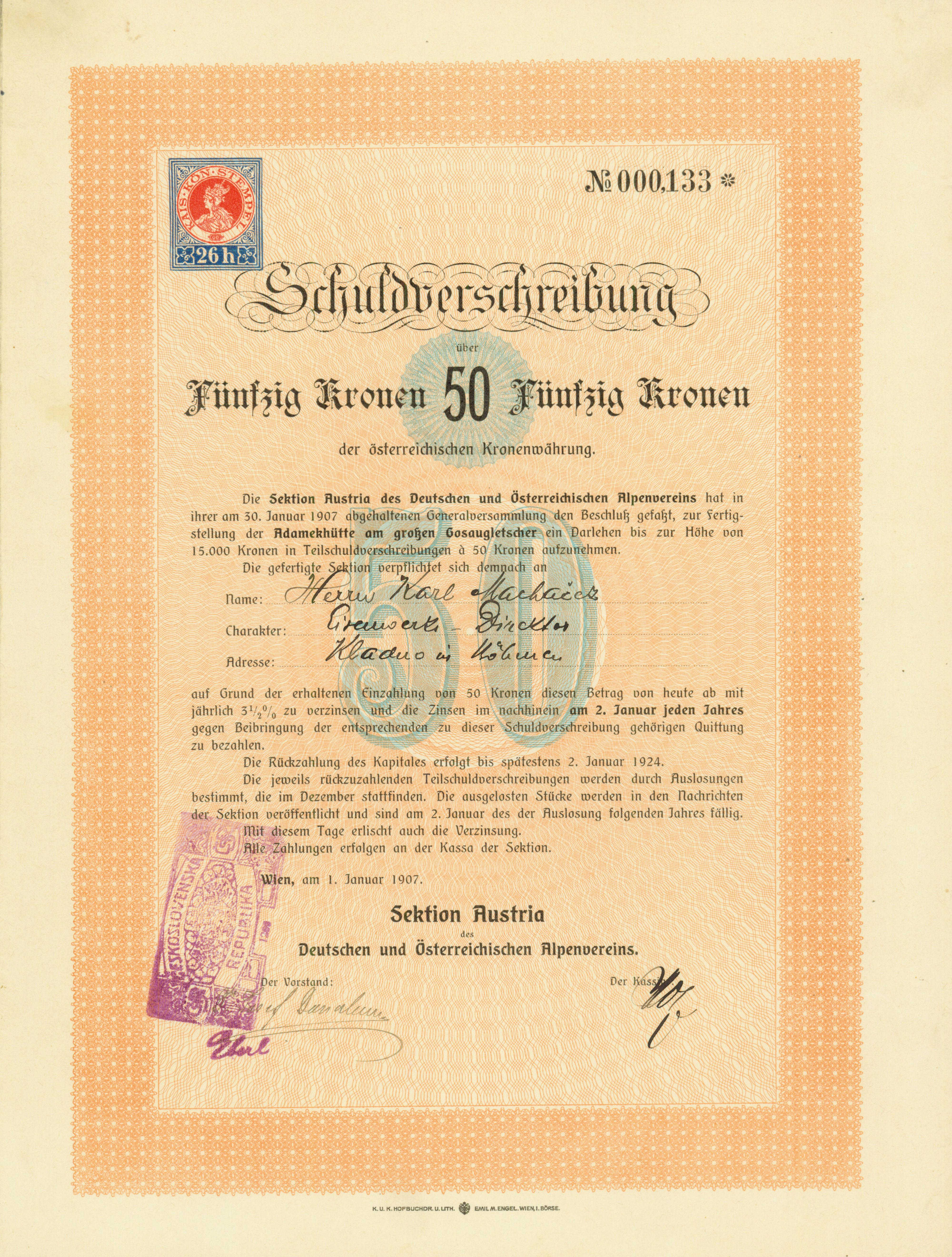
Bond of the Austrian Branch of the German and Austrian Alpine Club, issued 1 January 1907

The German and Austrian Alpine Club (German: Deutscher und Österreichischer Alpenverein, DuÖAV or DÖAV or DuOeAV) was a merger of the German, Austrian and German Bohemian Alpine Club that existed from 1873 to 1938.

== History ==
In 1862 the Sektion Austria was founded in Vienna by the academics Paul Grohmann, Friedrich Simony and Edmund von Mojsisovics. It was the first mountaineering club on the continent, modelled on the London Alpine Club. About seven years later, the Austrian mountaineer Franz Senn founded the Bildungsbürgerlicher Bergsteigerverein in Munich. Both organisations merged in 1873 to form the German and Austrian Alpine Club.

The main organisation consisted of numerous legally independent sections responsible for the upkeep of Alpine club huts and footpaths. In 1918 the DuÖAV purchased about 40 km^{2} (15 mi^{2}) of land at the Pasterze Glacier of the Grossglockner massif, which became the nucleus of the present-day High Tauern National Park. From the mid-1920s the club placed an increased focus on environmental concerns of the high mountain regions.

On the other hand, club life was shaped by rising nationalism and antisemitism. Some sections, such as in Vienna or Munich, implemented an "Aryan paragraph" even before World War I. After 1919, Jewish members were expelled from the club. In turn, the Sektion Donauland was founded by Viktor Frankl and Fred Zinnemann as a resort for Jewish alpinists; it was excluded from the DuÖAV main organisation in 1924. Even in most Alpine club huts, Jewish mountaineers were not admitted.

While the cross-national DuÖAV first could not be co-opted into the Nazi German League of the Reich for Physical Exercise (DRL), the organisation lost its independence upon the Austrian Anschluss to Nazi Germany and the occupation of the Czechoslovak Sudetenland in 1938. After World War II the Austrian Alpine Club (ÖAV) was re-established in 1945, followed by the separate German Alpine Club (DAV) in 1952.

== See also ==
- Austrian Tourist Club
- South Tyrol Alpine Club
