= DAV Panorama =

Mountaineering magazine in Germany

- Categories: Mountaineering magazine
- Frequency: Bimonthly
- Founded: 1999; 26 years ago
- Company: German Alpine Club
- Country: Germany
- Based in: Frankfurt
- Language: German
- Website: https://magazin.alpenverein.de/panorama/2023_04
- ISSN: 1437-5923
- OCLC: 476533406

DAV Panorama is a mountaineering magazine which is distributed to the members of the German Alpine Club (DAV). It has been published since 1999 and is one of the most read magazines in its category in Europe.

== History and profile ==
DAV Panorama was established in 1999. It is the official media outlet of the DAV and is distributed to all members. The goal of the magazine to assist the DAV in reaching its aims. DAV Panorama mostly features articles on mountaineering in the Alps and in other regions where mountaineering activities are carried out. Its publisher was Atlas Verlag in 2010, and it comes out bimonthly.

As of July 2004 DAV Panorama was read by both men and women (59% and 41%, respectively).

The circulation of DAV Panorama was more than 464,574 copies, and its readership was nearly 600,000 in 2004. It had a circulation of 517,453 copies making it the fourth largest special interest magazine in Europe.
