= Punta di Ercavallo =

Mountain in Italy

Coordinates: 46°19′36″N 10°33′56″E

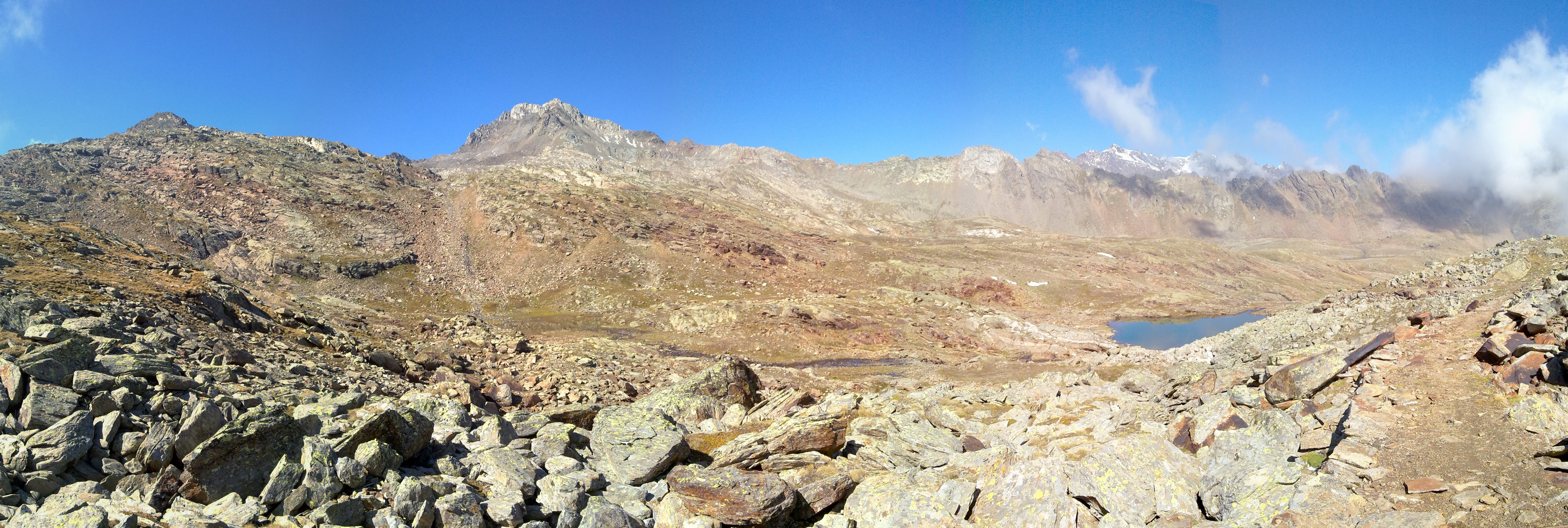

Highest point
- Elevation: 3,068 m (10,066 ft)

Geography
- Location: Lombardy and Trentino, Italy
- Parent range: Rhaetian Alps

The Punta di Ercavallo (Ercaàl in Lombard) is a mountain of the Rhaetian Alps, with an elevation of 3,068 metres (10,066 ft). It is located in the Italy, on the border between the Province of Brescia (Lombardy) and the Province of Trento (Trentino-Alto Adige).

Overlooking the Valle di Viso (a branch of the Val Camonica) in Lombardy and the valley of Peio in Trentino, the peak can be reached on foot from Case di Viso, a hamlet of Ponte di Legno.
