= Section (Alpine club) =

Part of an Alpine Club

The section (German: Sektion) of an Alpine club (or that of any such Alpine society or association) is an independent club or society that, together with the other sections, forms the main organisation ("Alpine club"). Membership of an Alpine club is normally only possible through membership of a section.

== Description ==
The task of an Alpine club section is the maintenance of tradition and culture, the Alpine training of its members, the planning and implementation of mountain tours and expeditions, and also the maintenance of huts and trails in the mountains. Many sections own Alpine club huts. After the initial task of the Alpine clubs - i.e. the development of the Alps for tourism and Alpinism, was considered as largely completed in Central Europe today, the work of the sections moved increasingly into the service sector, including the organization of Alpine courses and tours as well as sponsoring climbing gyms.

== Examples ==
- The German Alpine Club consists of 356 legally independent sections with a total of ca. 1,520,000 members. These are distributed all over Germany, the number and geographical density of the sections increasing markedly from north to south: for example, whilst there is only one section (Rostock) in post code region 17 (Neubrandenburg), there are over 20 sections in Munich. The membership numbers of Alpine club sections varies from under one hundred to several tens of thousands; the two largest German Alpine Club sections, Munich and Oberland, both resident in Munich, form a cooperative partnership (with free membership of the other section) and have together over 180,000 members. This places them just behind FC Bayern Munich and Borussia Dortmund as the sports club with the greatest membership in Germany.
- The Austrian Alpine Club has 194 sections with a total of 710,000 members, including a UK section (Sektion Britannia)
- The South Tyrol Alpine Club has 36 sections with a total of 76,000 members.
- The Italian Alpine Club has 512 sections and 316 sub-sections with a total of 306,000 members.
- The Swiss Alpine Club has 110 sections and 21 sub-sections with a total of 174,700 members including an Association of British Members.
- The French Alpine Club has 430 sections with a total of 110,000 members.

Not all Alpine clubs have this section structure. For example, the British Alpine Club has a central organisation with no subordinate sections.
