= Alpine club hut =

Type of mountain hut in the Alps

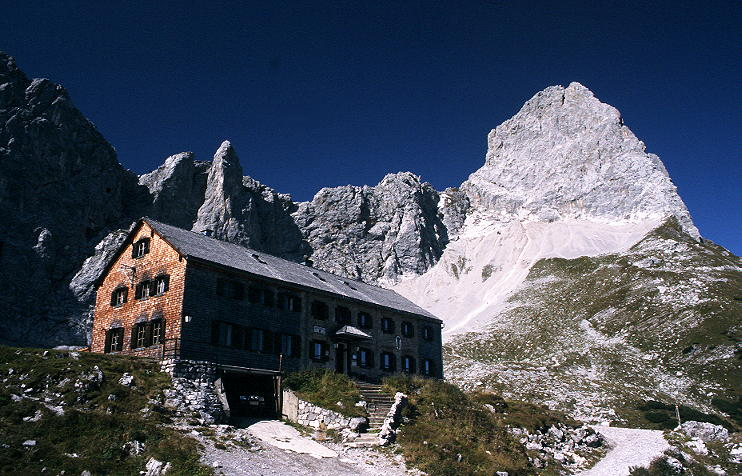
Lamsenjoch Hut (1953 m / 6407 ft) of the German Alpine Club, Karwendel range, Tyrol, Austria

Alpine club huts (German: Alpenvereinshütten) or simply club huts (Clubhütten) form the majority of the over 1,300 mountain huts in the Alps and are maintained by branches, or sections, of the various Alpine clubs. Although the usual English translation of Hütte is "hut", most of them are substantial buildings designed to accommodate and feed significant numbers of hikers and climbers and to withstand harsh high alpine conditions for decades.

== Purpose and facilities ==
They provide hikers and climbers with accommodation and shelter, mainly in the Alpine region. The greater number of these huts are managed; several are only suitable for those able to be self-contained. Although fundamentally all those involved in mountain activities have access to the huts, preferential service is given to members of the Alpine clubs. These include reduced accommodation rates, mountaineer's meals, hot water for tea, the right to provide one's own food and alcohol-free drink (sometimes for a nominal fee). For unmanaged huts members can obtain a master key (alpine club key, Universalschlüssel or AV-Schlüssel) for a deposit from the local alpine branch. Sleeping accommodation may consist of beds, a mattress room (Matratzenlager) and emergency beds or shakedowns.

== Reciprocal agreement between clubs ==
The larger alpine clubs in Europe have a multilateral agreement to treat members of other clubs as their own members at their club's huts (reciprocal rights). These clubs include: the German and Austrian Alpine Clubs, the Club Alpin Français, the Club Alpino Italiano, the Swiss Alpine Club and the Federación Española de Montanismo as well as several smaller clubs.

== Categories ==
The German and Austrian Alpine Clubs as well as other alpine clubs divide their mountain huts into 3 categories based on situation and facilities as follows:

- Category I: these huts are usually situated at least 1 hour's walk from road transport or the nearest road and may have basic facilities. Some are tiny shelters near the summit of a mountain. In larger huts food and beverages may be served. Members have priority only in allocation of accommodation and claim a minimum discount of 50%.
- Category II: located in popular areas; and usually accessible by road or cableway, these huts are often open throughout the year. With better facilities and more varied catering than category I huts, members have a minimum discount of 30%.
- Category III: primarily used by day visitors and accessible by car or cableway. These huts are almost akin to hotels, offering a minimum overnight discount of 10% to alpine club members.

== Private huts ==
In addition to the alpine club huts there is also a large number of alpine accommodation huts run by private individuals. These are listed in the List of mountain huts in the Alps.

== North America ==
The Alpine Club of Canada (ACC) is Canada's national mountain club, based in Canmore, Alberta, the ACC has been a focal point for Canadian mountaineers since 1906. The Alpine Club of Canada operates the largest network of back-country accommodation in North America. Its network of 25 alpine club huts are scattered across Canada, predominantly throughout the Canadian Rockies.

== See also ==
- List of mountain huts in the Alps
