= Sobretta-Gavia Group =

Mountain massif in Italy

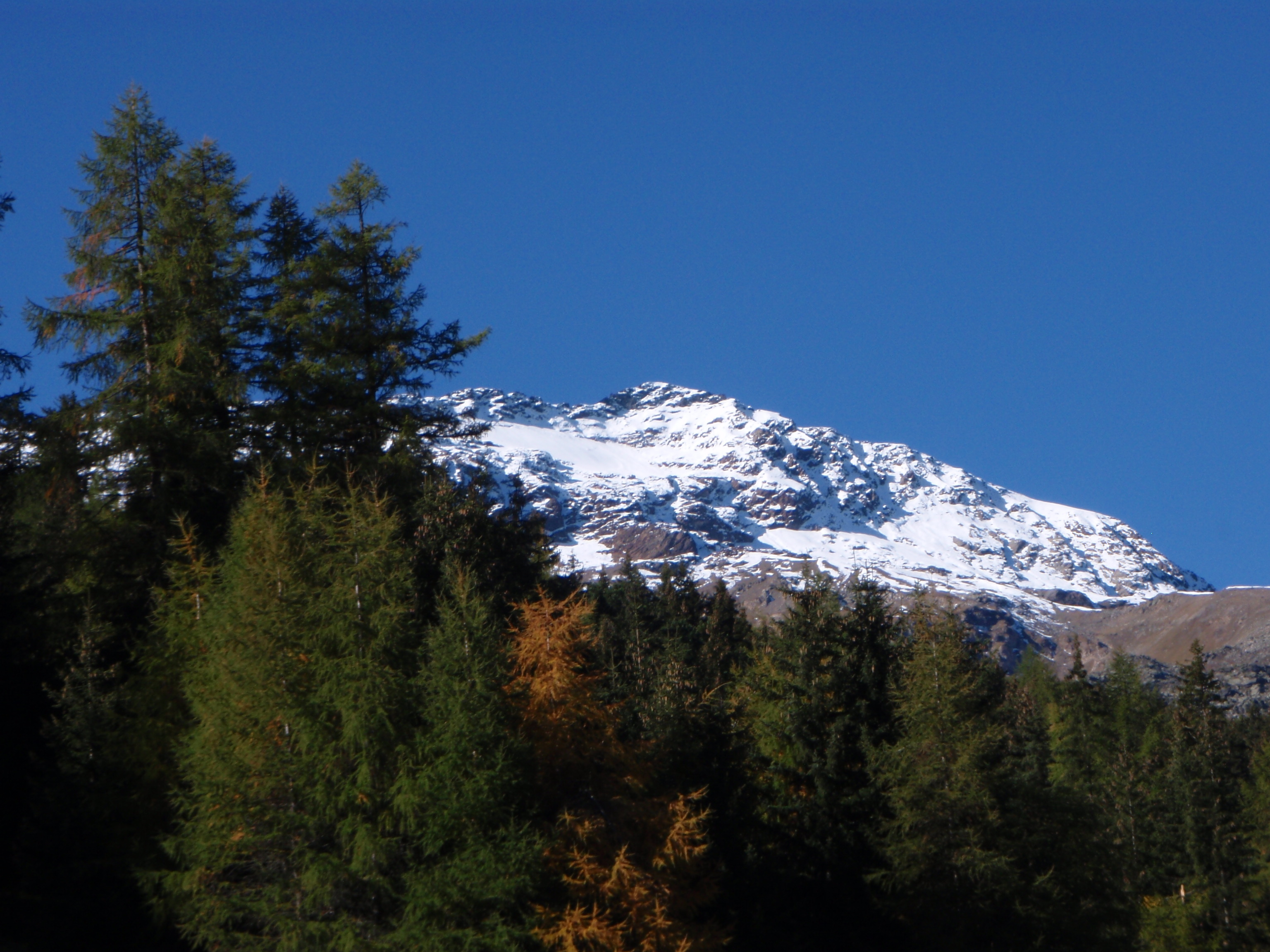
- Monte Sobretta

Highest point
- Peak: Monte Sobretta
- Elevation: 3,296 m (10,814 ft)

Geography
- State(s): Sondrio / Brescia, Lombardy, Italy
- Range coordinates: 46°24′N 10°24′E
- Parent range: Central Eastern Alps/Southern Alps

The Sobretta-Gavia Group (German: Sobretta-Gavia-Gruppe, Italian: Gruppo Sobretta-Gavia) is a mountain massif that extends between the upper Veltlin and the upper Valcamonica in the Italian provinces of Sondrio and Brescia.

== Location ==
The Sobretta-Gavia Group is classified geologically with the Central Eastern Alps because it lies north of the geological fault of the Periadriatic Seam, but more regionally and geographically as part of the Southern Alps, because it lies south of the Veltlin (Adda)–Vintschgau (Etsch) longitudinal valley trough. According to the Alpine Club Classification of the Eastern Alps (AVE) the group is bounded as follows:

- to the northeast by the Ortler Group and the Bormio–Gavia Pass–Ponte di Legno line
- by the Adamello-Presanella Alps to the southeast with the lower reaches of the Oglio Narcanello (upper Valcamonica) between Ponte di Legno and Edolo as the boundary
- to the south and west by the Bergamo Alps by the upper reaches of the Oglio (Edolo)–Passo dell'Aprica–Tresenda/Valtellina and the Veltlin of the Adda upstream to Tirano
- to the northwest by the Livigno Alps of the upper Veltlin to Bormio

Until the new AVE classification emerged in 1984 this group was counted as part of the Ortler Group according to the Moriggl classification (ME) of 1924. According to Italian custom it is counted as part of the Rhaetian Alps.

== Important peaks ==
Peak	Height (metres)
Monte Sobretta	3,296 m
Monte Gavia	3,223 m
Punta di Pietra Rossa	3,212 m
Monte Vallecetta	3,148 m
Monte Serottini	2,967 m

== Huts and trails ==
- Albergo Bonetta, 2,610 m, 16 beds, private – ascent on the Monte Gavia, Corno dei Tre Signori (3,359 m)
- Rifugio Berni al Gavia, 2,545 m, 41 beds, CAI – Corno dei Tre Signori, Punta San Matteo (3,684 m), Pizzo Tresero (3.606 m)
