= Austrian Tourist Club =

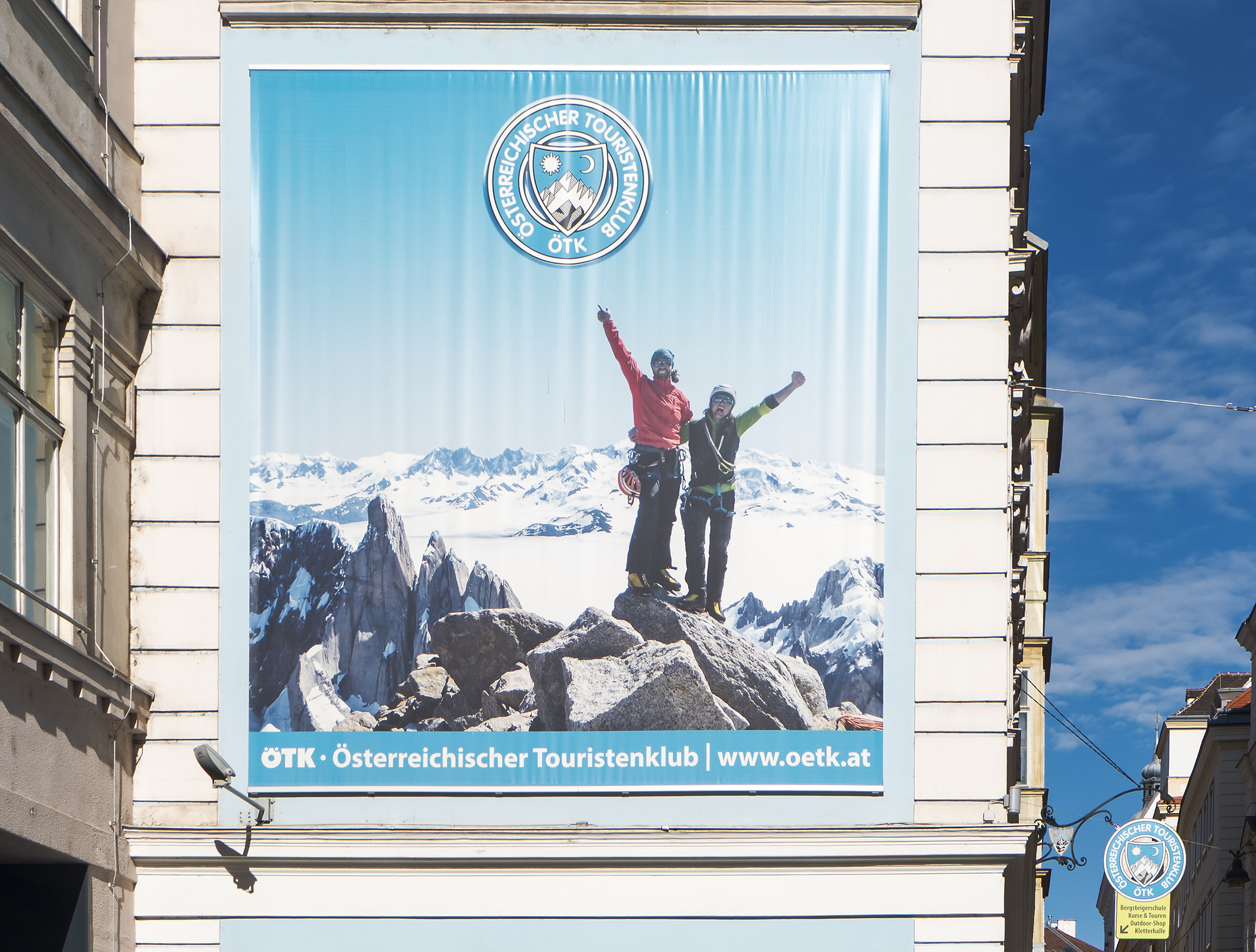
- Formation: 1869
- Location: Vienna
- Members: 24,000 (2007)
- Main organ: 35 sections (53 huts)
- Website: www.touristenklub.at

The Austrian Tourist Club (German: Österreichische Touristenklub) or ÖTK is the second oldest and third largest Alpine club in Austria.

The foundation of the club goes back to an initiative by Gustav Jäger, publisher of Der Tourist, the first tourist magazine in Austria. In contrast with the Austrian Alpine Club founded in 1862, Jäger aimed first and foremost to support nature in his local area and the states of Vienna and Lower Austria.

== Sources ==
- Rudl Klose: Einhundert Jahre Österreichischer Touristenklub 1869–1969. Österreichischer Touristenklub, Vienna, 1969
- Otto W. Steiner: Österreichischer Touristenklub. 100 Jahre Österreichischer Touristenklub, 1869–1969. Vienna, 1969
