= Matratzenlager =

Type of sleeping accommodation offered in mountain huts

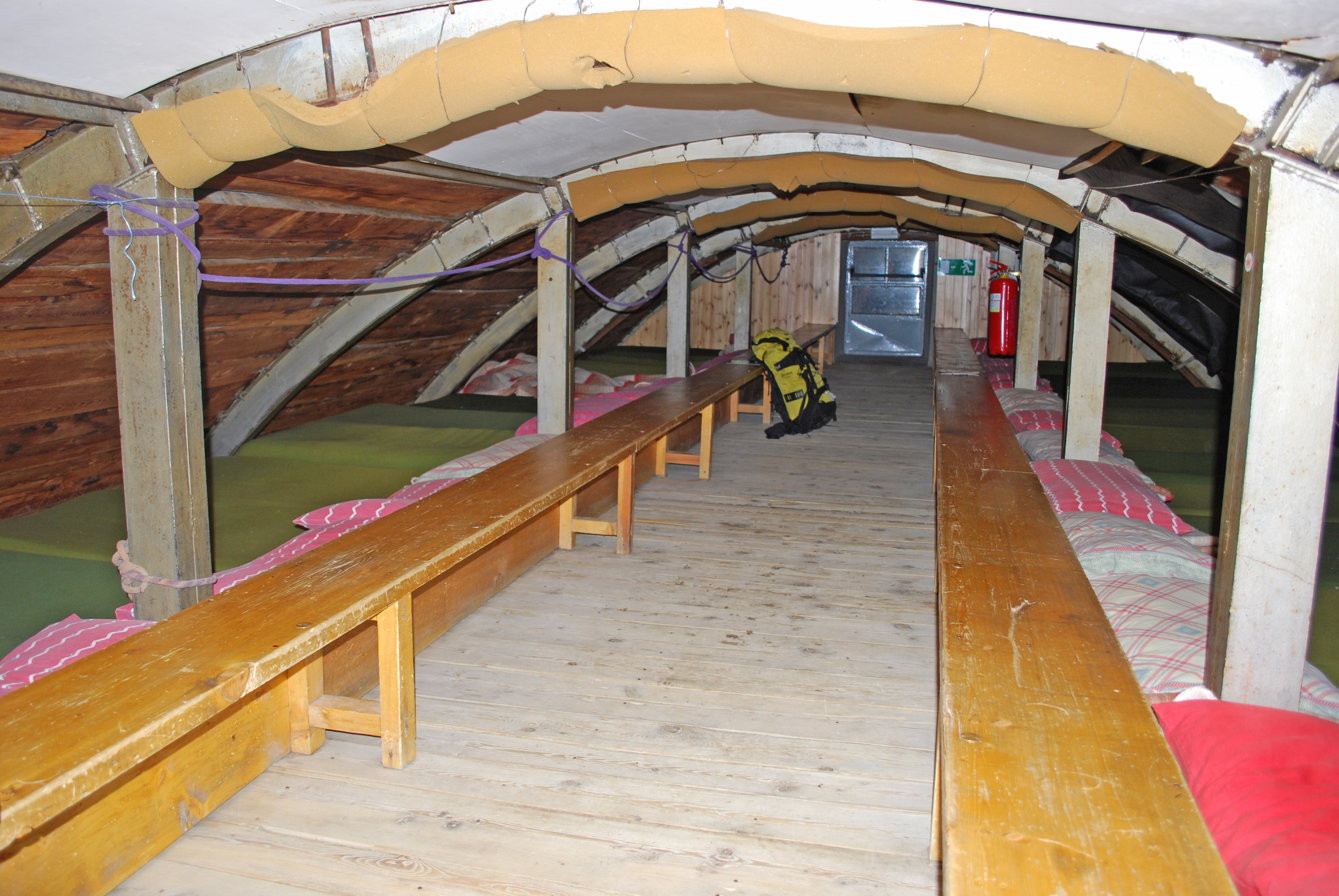
Matratzenlager at the Rifugio Vittorio Emanuele II

A Matratzenlager ("mattress room"), sometimes called Massenlager or Touristenlager, is the simplest and cheapest type of sleeping accommodation offered in mountain huts. It generally consists of a large room with mattresses usually placed very close together.

The Matratzenlager is usually found in the attic of the hut and can consist of about 10 to 100 bedspaces. Large Matratzenlagers are divided into rooms with a maximum of 20-30 bedspaces in order to ensure a reasonable night's sleep. Often there are also smaller rooms for families.

The mattresses usually do not lie on the floor, but on a large wooden frame and each bedspace is given its own pillow and up to two woollen blankets (Alpenvereinsdecken or "Alpine club blankets"). At the head or the foot are small storage areas.

At Alpine club huts the use of hut sleeping bags is mandatory.
