= Swiss Alpine Club =

Mountaineering club

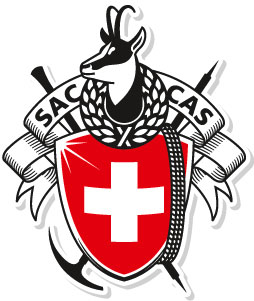
Official logo of the Swiss Alpine Club.

The Swiss Alpine Club (German: Schweizer Alpen-Club, French: Club Alpin Suisse, Italian: Club Alpino Svizzero, Romansh: Club Alpin Svizzer) is the largest mountaineering club in Switzerland. It was founded in 1863 in Olten and it is now composed of 110 sections with 174,726 members (2023). These include the Association of British Members of the Swiss Alpine Club.

Founded 15 years after the modern Swiss state, the Swiss Alpine Club (SAC) has been credited with playing a role in shaping national identity by promoting knowledge of the Alps and contributing to topographic mapping. Several Swiss cabinet members have belonged to the SAC over the years.

== History ==
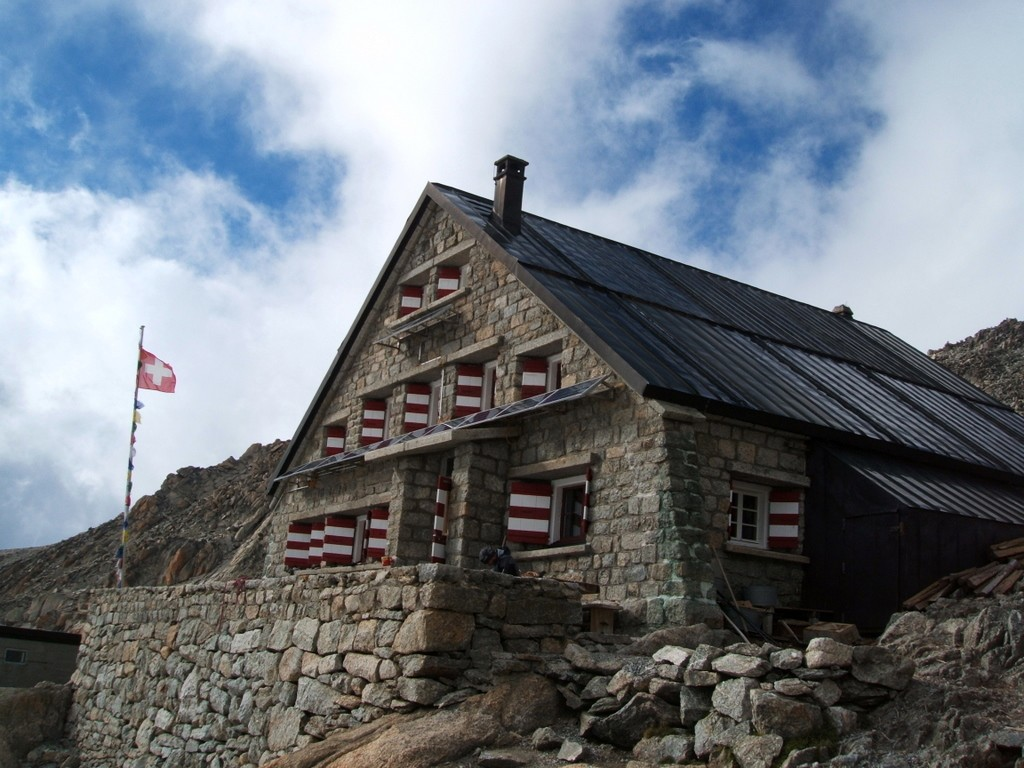

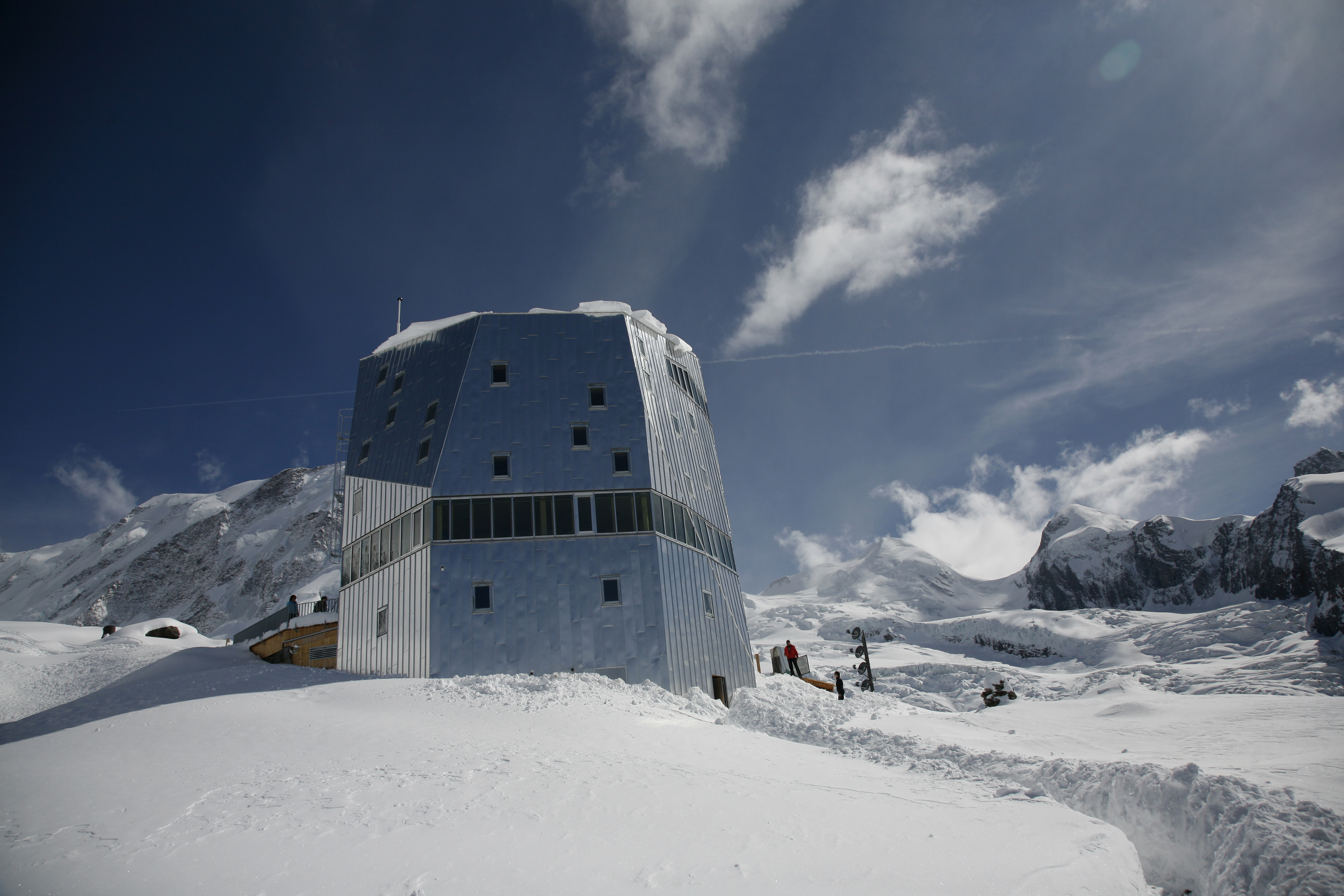
Two mountain huts of different generations: the Trient Hut and the Monte Rosa Hut

The Swiss Alpine Club was the first Alpine club founded in continental Europe after the foundation of the Alpine Club (1857) in London. One of the founders and the first president of the Club was Dr. Melchior Ulrich; other members were Gottlieb Samuel Studer and Dr. Simler. The inaugural meeting was held in Olten.

With the increasing number of climbers, steps had to be taken to make the approach to the mountains a little less complicated and exhausting. Until mountain huts were built, there had been no choice for the climbers other than sleeping in the highest chalets or in a Bivouac shelter under some overhanging rocks and, in both cases, firewood had to be carried up. The Swiss Alpine Club during the first twenty-five years of its existence contributed to build thirty-eight huts, of which the oldest was the Grünhorn hut on the Tödi (1863), followed by the Trift hut, near the Dammastock (1864). The Matterhorn hut was built in 1865, the Mountet in 1871, the Weisshorn Hut in 1876, the Concordia on the Aletsch glacier and the Boval hut in 1877.

Beyond its sporting activities, SAC contributed to shaping Swiss national identity in the decades after its founding. In the 19th century, it helped improve topographic mapping, especially in mountain areas where the existing Dufour maps showed less detail. The club also used panorama maps and observation towers to help the public identify mountains and learn their names. According to Swissinfo, the SAC "has played an important role in forging a national identity." Several Swiss federal ministers, including four cabinet members in the 1990s, have been SAC members.

=== Timeline ===
- 1863: Foundation of the club, after the Alpine Club (1857) and the Austrian Alpine Club (1862).
- 1863: Construction of the first mountain hut: the Grünhornhütte
- 1864: First publication a journal which will be named later, Die Alpen, Les Alpes
- 1872: Pilatus section campaigns to preserve the Honigstein erratic rock near Roggliswil.
- 1900: The SAC is composed of 43 sections and 6000 members
- 1905: Opening of the Swiss Alpine Museum in Bern
- 1907: Women are not allowed in the club
- 1963: The club is constituted of 44'500 members (men only)
- 1977: Foundation of the central office in Bern
- 1980: Merger with the Women's Swiss Alpine Club (founded in 1918); women became full members and total membership reaches 75,600.
- 1992: The first cultural prize of the SAC is attributed
- 1994: The SAC officially promotes competition climbing
- 1996: Abolition of the central committee
- 2006: The SAC receives the Milestone tourism prize
- 2016: Club membership reached 150,000, ranking it as the fourth‑largest sports association in Switzerland

== See also ==
- Swiss Alps
- Swiss hiking network
