= Spanish Federation for Mountain and Climbing Sports =

National sports organisation

The Spanish Federation for Mountain and Climbing Sports (Spanish: Federación Española de Deportes de Montaña y Escalada, FEDME) located in the Floridablanca 84 in Barcelona, is the Spanish federation of mountain and climbing sports. It was founded under the name Federación Española de Alpinismo (Spanish federation of alpinism) on July 1, 1922, and renamed to Federación de Montañismo later. As of 2023, the federation has 2,949 registered clubs and 248,252 federated members.

The aim of the FEDME is the protection of the Alps, the support of mountain huts, alpine tours, and of GR footpathes as well as the supervision of mountain and winter sports like fell running, alpinism, mountain as well as snowshoe hiking, and ski mountaineering. The FEDME also supports the Spain national ski mountaineering team, called Equipo PNTD Esquí de Montaña.
