= Monte Gavia =

Mountain in Italy

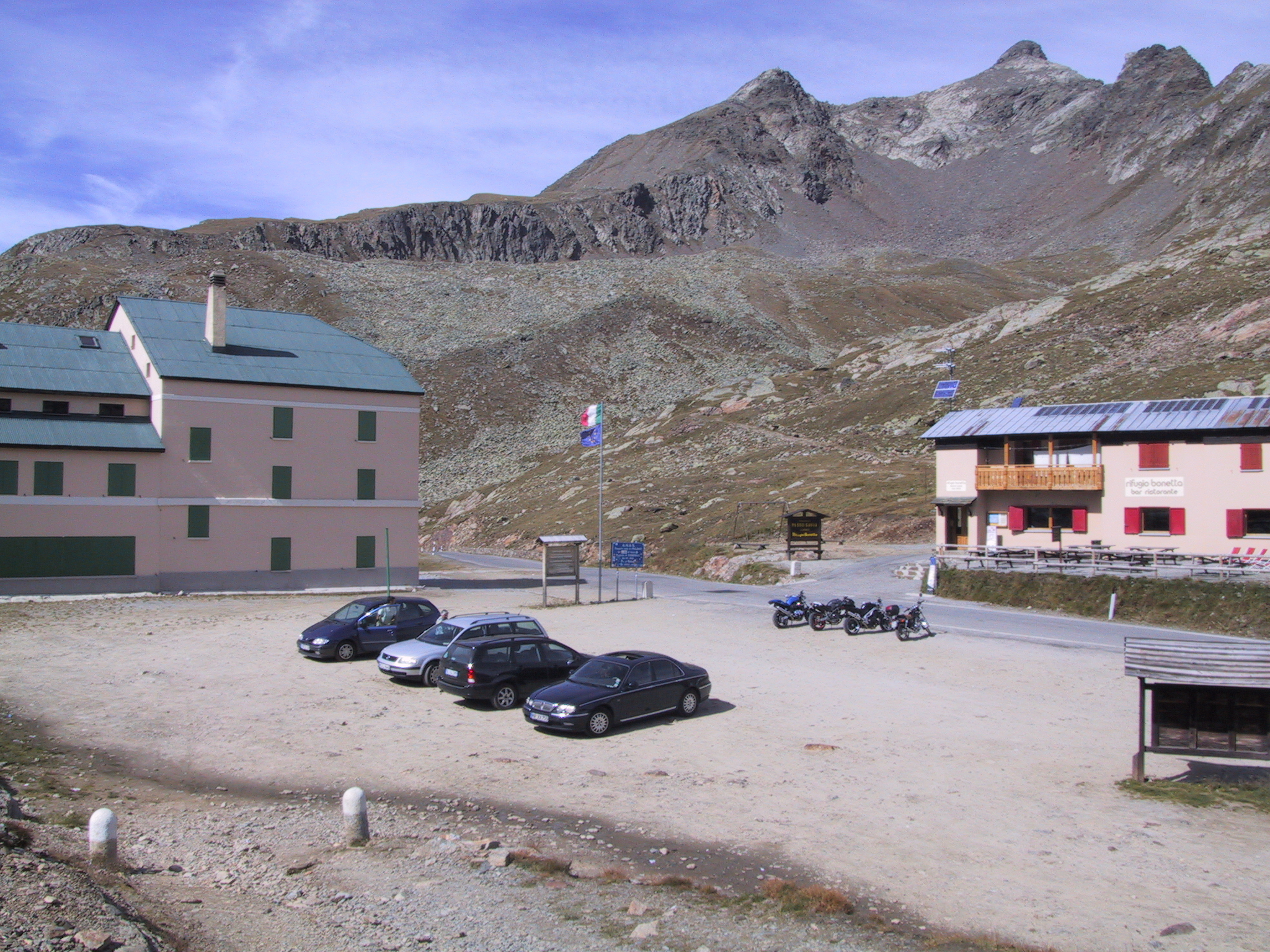
- Monte Gavia from the Gavia Pass

Highest point
- Elevation: 3,223 m (10,574 ft)
- Prominence: 323 m (1,060 ft)
- Listing: Alpine mountains above 3000 m
- Coordinates: 46°21′21″N 10°28′21″E

Geography
- Location within Alps
- Location: Lombardy, Italy
- Parent range: Sobretta-Gavia Group

Monte Gavia is a mountain of the Sobretta-Gavia Group in Lombardy, Italy. It has an elevation of 3,222 metres and towers above the Gavia Pass.
