= German Alpine Club =

Sports union in Germany

- Sport: Mountaineering
- Category: Amateur athletic association
- Founded: 9 May 1869
- Affiliation: International Federation of Sport Climbing
- Regional affiliation: 356 sections
- Headquarters: Munich
- President: Josef Klenner

Official website
- alpenverein.de
- (Germany)

The German Alpine Club (German: Deutscher Alpenverein, DAV for short) is the world's largest climbing association and the eighth-largest sporting association in Germany. It is a member of the German Olympic Sports Confederation and the competent body for sport and competition climbing, hiking, mountaineering, hill walking, ice climbing, mountain expeditions, as well as ski mountaineering. It is an association made up of local branches known as 'sections'.

== History ==
The German Alpine Club was founded as Bildungsbürgerlicher Bergsteigerverein on 9 May 1869 in Munich by 36 former members of the Austrian Alpine Club around the Ötztal curate Franz Senn. It was founded in order to promote the development of tourism in the Eastern Alps through the building of mountain huts, and establishment of hiking trails, and via ferratas. The association had a large membership from the beginning, attracting 1,070 members in the first ten months.

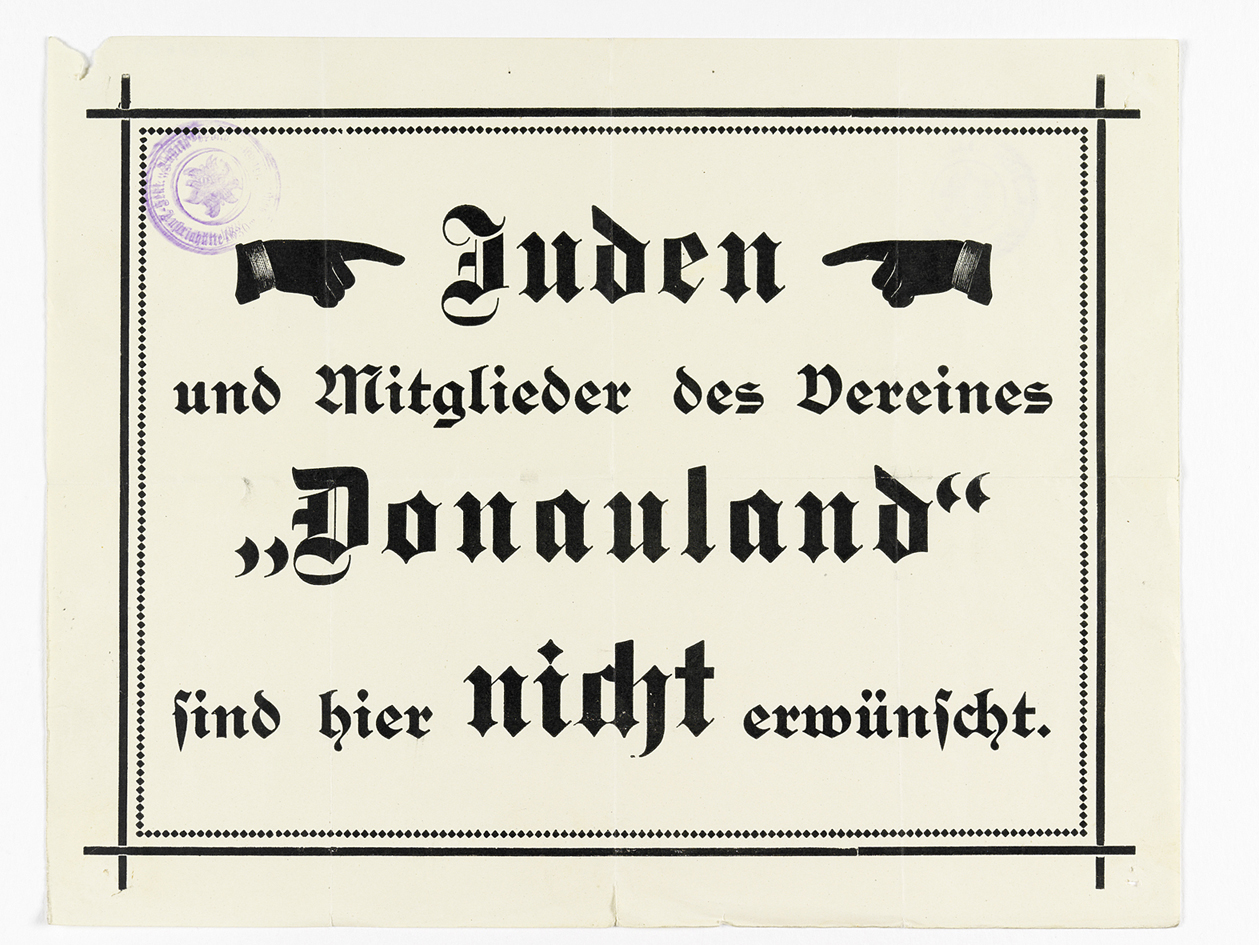
Mountain hut notice prohibiting the entry of Jews and Donauland members, c.1930

The German and the Austrian societies merged in 1873 to form the German and Austrian Alpine Club (DÖAV). By the late 19th century, the association's policies became increasingly nationalistic and antisemitic. In 1899, the Brandenburg section amended an "Aryan paragraph" to exclude non-Christian members, followed by the Vienna section in 1905 and the Alpine associations of Vienna in 1907 and Munich in 1910. After World War I, Jewish members, including Viktor Frankl and Fred Zinnemann, who made up one third of the membership, were banned in most branches. They, in turn, established a separate Donauland section, insisting on recognition by the DÖAV. The Donauland members were officially ousted in 1924. Jews were even banned from using the DÖAV mountain huts.

Following Austrian Anschluss to Nazi Germany in 1938, the DÖAV, under the leadership of Arthur Seyss-Inquart, was renamed as the Deutscher Alpenverein (DAV) and was incorporated into the Nationalsozialistischer Reichsbund für Leibesübungen (National Socialist League of the Reich for Physical Exercise) as its mountaineering association. After World War II, the DAV was dissolved by the Allied authorities. Its assets were held by the Austrian Alpine Club, acting as trustees.

The German Alpine Club was re-established in 1952. It joined the Deutscher Sportbund in 1992. After leaving the Union Internationale des Associations d'Alpinisme in 2008 due to differences of opinion regarding competitive and recreational sports, the German and Austrian Alpine Clubs rejoined the Union Internationale des Associations d'Alpinisme in 2013.

== Structure ==
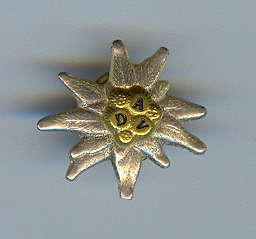
DAV Edelweiss badge

The DAV is an umbrella organization comprising 356 legally independent regional sections with a total of around 1.5 million members. Every branch is a registered voluntary association (Eingetragener Verein, e.V.) in its own right and solely responsible for admitting members. The collective body of the branches is represented by the general assembly, association council, and presidium.

The primary task of the Club is the maintenance of its mountain huts through its sections which currently provide 325 alpine club huts for hikers and mountaineers as well as 220 indoor climbing gyms. The DAV publishes DAV Panorama magazine, Alpine Club maps and Alpine Club Guides in cooperation with Bergverlag Rother, organises hill walks and alpine-style tours, makes mountaineering equipment available to rent and arranges collective insurance. It also runs the Alpine Museum on Prater Island in Munich. In recent years, the Club's policies have shifted towards habitat conservation, with a particular focus on the protection of the fauna and flora of the Alps.

== Sources ==
- Anneliese Gidl: Alpenverein. Die Städter entdecken die Alpen. Der Deutsche und Österreichische Alpenverein von der Gründung bis zum Ende des Ersten Weltkrieges. Böhlau, Wien u. a. 2007, ISBN 978-3-205-77668-0. (Rezension)
- Holt, Lee Wallace. Mountains, Mountaineering and Modernity: A Cultural History of German and Austrian Mountaineering, 1900-1945. ProQuest, 2008.
- Nicholas Mailänder: Im Zeichen des Edelweiß. Die Geschichte Münchens als Bergsteigerstadt. Zürich 2006.
- Rainer Amstädter: Der Alpinismus. Kultur, Organisation, Politik. Wien 1996.
