= Monte Sobretta =

Mountain in Italy

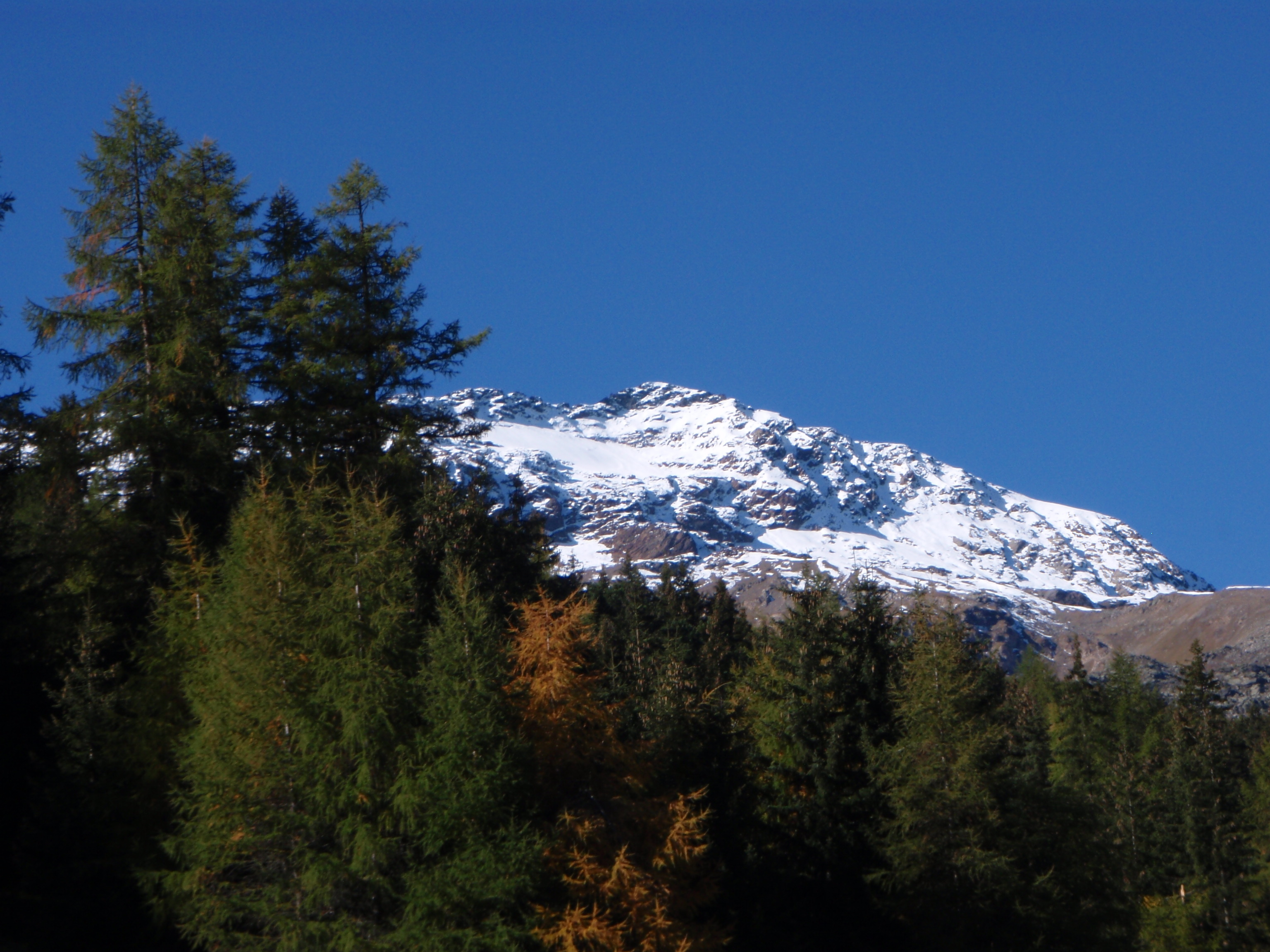
- Monte Sobretta

Highest point
- Elevation: 3,296 m (10,814 ft)
- Prominence: 835 m (2,740 ft)
- Listing: Alpine mountains above 3000 m
- Coordinates: 46°24′N 10°26′E

Geography
- Location within Alps
- Location: Lombardy, Italy
- Parent range: Sobretta-Gavia Group

Monte Sobretta is the highest mountain of the Sobretta-Gavia Group in Lombardy, Italy. It has an elevation of 3,296 m s.l.m.

== Access roads and normal climbing route ==
To access the mountain you follow the road towards the Gavia pass, either from Ponte di Legno in the south or from Santa Caterina Valfurva in the north. There is a parking area at around 2300 meters above the sea level on the north side of the mountain.

From the parking area to the summit takes approximately four hours. Special equipment is not required. The route is snow-free during the summer and involves walking.
