= South Tyrol Alpine Club =

Mountain climbing association in Italy

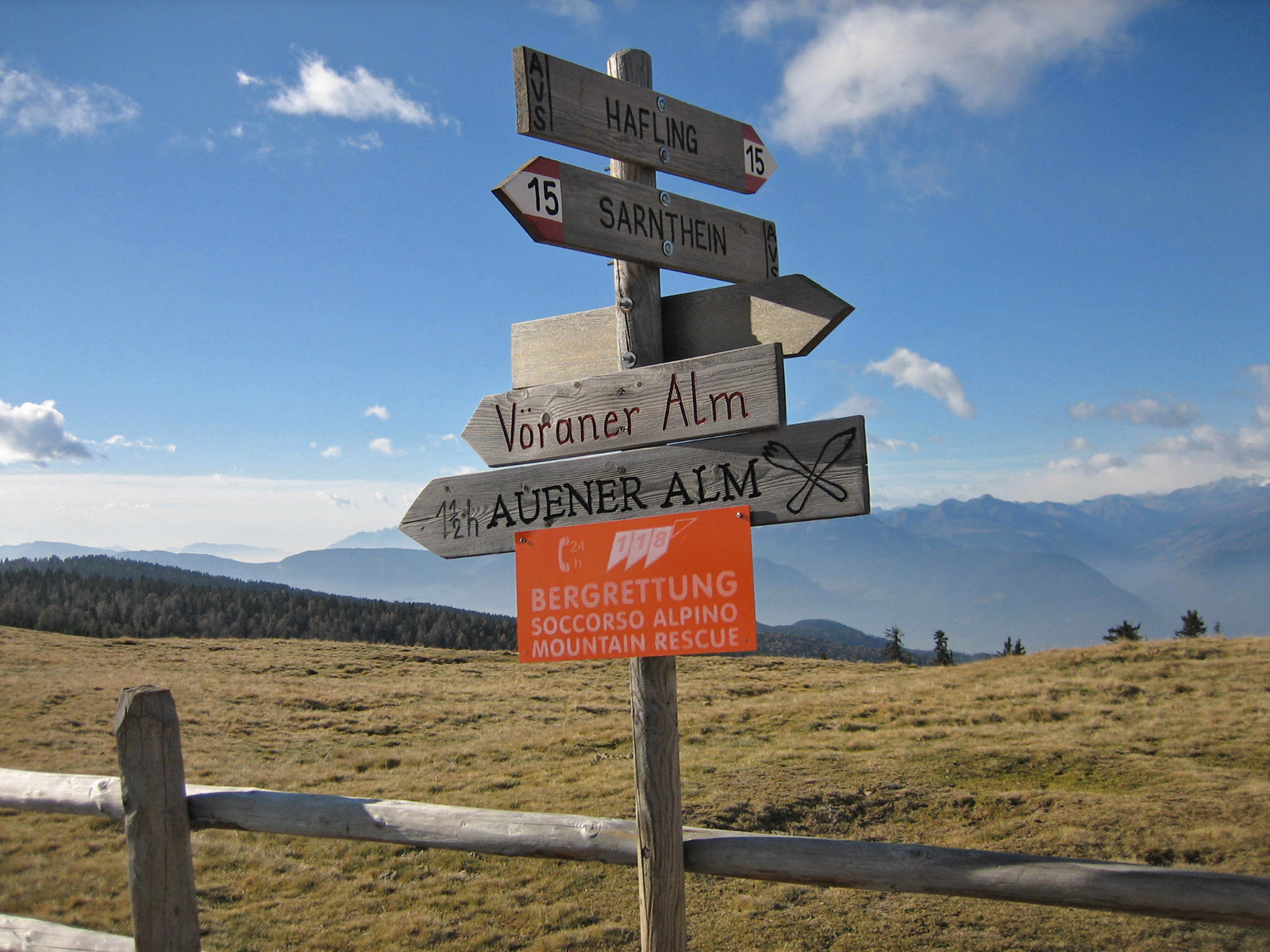
AVS signposts on the Tschögglberg

The South Tyrol Alpine Club (German: Alpenverein Südtirol, Italian: Club Alpino Altoatesino), abbreviated AVS, is an association of German and Ladin-speaking mountain climbers in South Tyrol, northern Italy. Founded in 1946, it is subdivided into 36 sections and 58 local divisions. The AVS is based in Bolzano and has more than 76,000 members.

== History ==
Originally, the South Tyrolean alpine club sections were members of the German and Austrian Alpine Club (Deutscher und Österreichischer Alpenverein). In 1869 the first sections were founded in Bozen and Niederdorf, Puster Valley. By 1910, 15 more sections had been established in South Tyrol. They initiated the construction of 19 mountain huts, an extensive network of paths through the mountains and training for mountain guides. After the end of the First World War, the annexation of South Tyrol by Italy and the coming into power of the fascists, the South Tyrolean sections were disappropriated and banned in 1923 (see Italianization of South Tyrol). After the end of the Second World War, on December 31, 1945, the military administration of the Allies permitted the foundation of the South Tyrol Alpine Club. Its inaugural meeting took place in Bolzano on 14 June 1946.

Nowadays, the AVS takes care of more than 9,500 km of hiking trails and is involved in nature conservancy and South Tyrolean cultural issues as well. The club is a member of the Union Internationale des Associations d'Alpinisme and the Club Arc Alpin. In 2007, the AVS finished its project to digitalise all hiking trails in South Tyrol.

== See also ==
- Austrian Alpine Club
