= Austrian Alpine Club =

Sports club

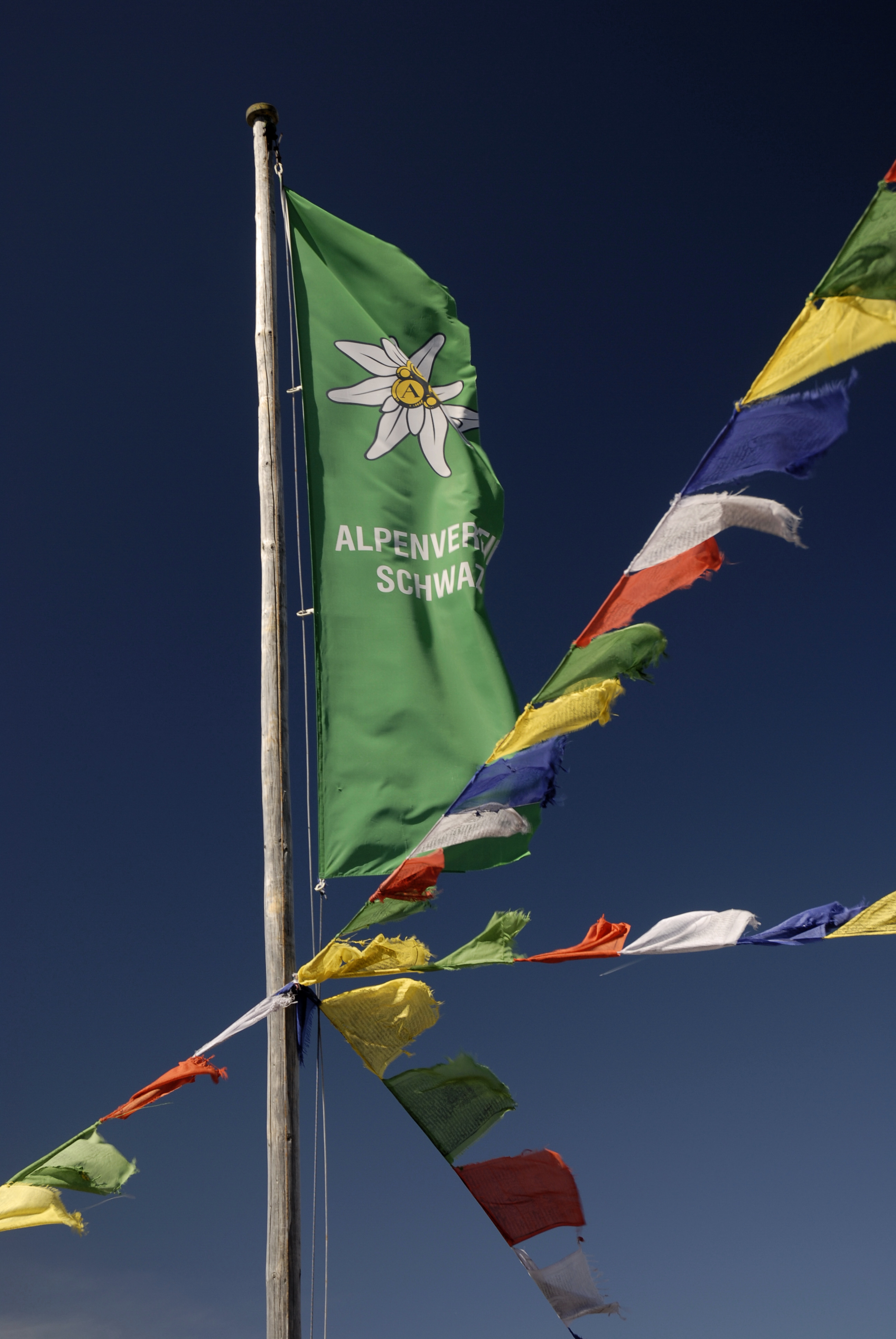
- Sport: Mountaineering
- Category: Amateur athletic association
- Founded: November 19, 1862
- Regional affiliation: 194 sections
- Headquarters: Innsbruck
- President: Dr. Wolfgang Schnabl

Official website
- www.alpenverein.at
- (Austria)

The Austrian Alpine Club (German: Österreichischer Alpenverein) has about 700,000 members in 194 sections and is the largest mountaineering organisation in Austria. It is responsible for the upkeep of over 234 alpine huts in Austria and neighbouring countries. It also maintains over 26,000 kilometres of footpaths, and produces detailed maps of key mountain areas within Austria. Much of this work is done by the association's 22,000 volunteers. The association has a museum in Innsbruck dedicated to the history of alpinism. It also has sections in Belgium and the United Kingdom, and a group in Poland.

== See also ==
- South Tyrol Alpine Club (Alpenverein Südtirol, AVS)
- German Alpine Club (Deutscher Alpenverein, DAV)
