= Tectonostratigraphy =

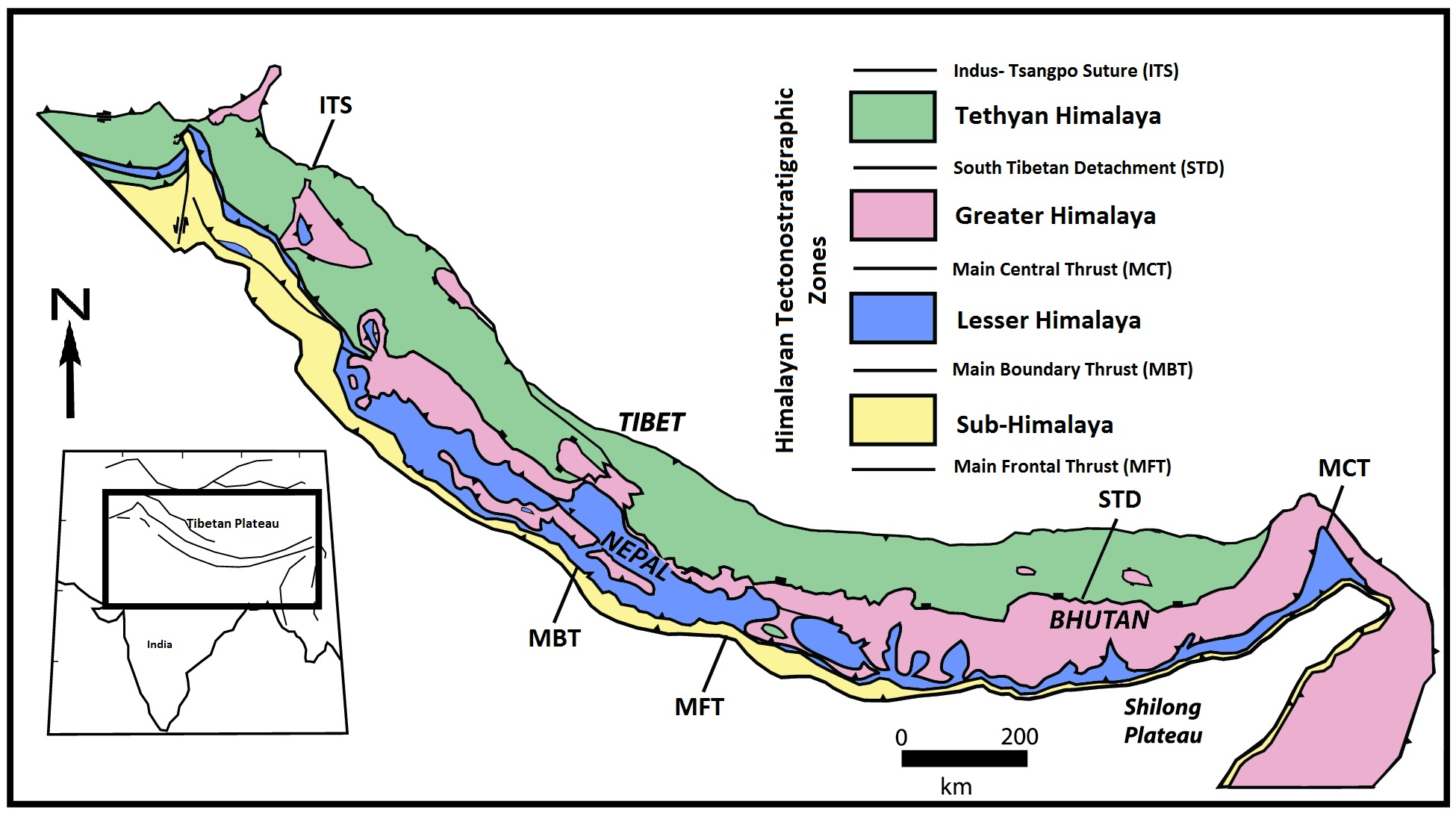
Map of Himalayan tectonostratigraphic zones

In geology, tectonostratigraphy is stratigraphy that refers either to rock sequences in which large-scale layering is caused by the stacking of thrust sheets, or nappes, in areas of thrust tectonics or to the effects of tectonics on lithostratigraphy.

== Tectonically formed stratigraphy ==
One example of such a tectonostratigraphy is the Scandinavian Caledonides. Within the entire exposed 1800 km length of this orogenic belt the following sequence is recognised from the base upwards:

- Autochthon

undisturbed foreland of the Baltic plate

- Parautochthon

thrust sheets that have moved only a short distance (up to tens of kilometres) from their original position

- Lower allochthon

far travelled thrust sheets derived from the Baltic plate passive margin, mainly sediments associated with the break-up of Rodinia

- Middle allochthon

also derived from the margin of the Baltic plate, Proterozoic basement and its psammitic cover

- Upper allochthon

thrust sheets including island arc and ophiolitic sequences

- Uppermost allochthon

thrust sheets containing sediments with fossil assemblages indicating an origin on the margin of the Laurentian plate

This vertically stacked sequence thus represents the passive margins of Baltica and Laurentia and intervening island arcs and back-arc basins telescoped together and emplaced on top of the Baltic Shield, involving hundreds of km of shortening.

Within this overall stratigraphy the individual layers have their own tectonostratigraphy of stacked thrust sheets.

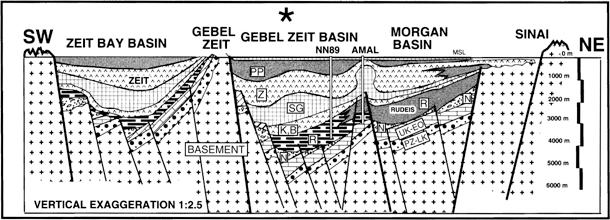
Generalised structural cross-section through the central part of the Gulf of Suez. PZ-LK = Paleozoic to lower Cretaceous Nubia (reservoir rock); UK-EO = Upper Cretaceous to Eocene pre-rift carbonate (source rock); N, R, K, and B = syn- and post-rift Nukhul, Rudeis, Kareem and Belayim formation (sources, reservoirs, seals and overburden); SG = South Gharib salt (seal and overburden); Z=Zeit (seals and overburden); and PP = Plio-Pleistocene (overburden)

== Effects of active tectonics on lithostratigraphy ==
Tectonic events are typically recorded in sediments being deposited at the same time. In the case of a rift, for instance, the sedimentary sequence is normally broken down into three parts:

- The pre-rift includes a sequence deposited before the onset of rifting, recognised by the lack of thickness and sedimentary facies changes across the rift faults.
- The syn-rift includes a sequence deposited during active rifting, typically showing facies and thickness changes across the active faults, unconformities on the fault footwalls may pass laterally into continuous conformable sequences in the hanging walls.
- The post-rift includes a sequence deposited after the rifting has finished, it may still show thickness and facies changes around the rift faults due to the effects of differential compaction and remnant rift topography, particularly in the earliest part of the sequence.

This relatively straightforward nomenclature may become difficult to use, however, in the case of multiphase rifting with the post-rift from one event being the pre-rift to a later event.

== See also ==
- Biostratigraphy
- Chronostratigraphy
- Terrane
