= Geologic timeline of Western North America =

The geological timeline of Western North America includes significant geological events over millions of years in the evolution of Western North America, including several tectonic plate interactions involving the North American plate and leading to the formation of various mountain ranges and seaways. Most of these events occurred during the Mesozoic Era (252 to 66 million years ago) and the Cenozoic Era (from 66 million years ago).

== Timeline ==
Dates in the table are approximate ("Ma" = millions of years ago).

Date	Period/epoch	Event
350 Ma	Devonian	An unnamed terrane collides and accretes to the North American plate, along a line roughly coinciding with the Nevada–Utah border and called the Carlin Unconformity.
250 Ma	Permian	The Sonomia terrane collides and accretes to the North American plate, along a line called the Golconda Thrust (also the name of the event) which runs through central Nevada.
200 Ma	Triassic	Sierra Nevada batholith first develops.
180 Ma	Jurassic	The Intermontane plate collides with the Pacific Northwest, the remnants of which form the Intermontane Belt today.
165 Ma	Jurassic	The Smartville Block, an island arc terrane, collides and accretes to the North American plate, along a line which coincides with the Mother Lode country of California.
140 Ma	Jurassic	Second wave of plutons added to Sierra batholith.
115 Ma	Cretaceous	The Insular plate collides with the Pacific Northwest. The remnants of that terrane comprise the Insular Belt today, of which Vancouver Island is a part.
90 Ma	Cretaceous	Third and last wave of plutons added to Sierra batholith.
51 Ma	Eocene	The Siletzia plate collides with the Pacific Northwest, forming the coast of much of Washington and Oregon.
43 Ma	Eocene	The Pacific plate changes its direction of motion from north to northwest.
35 Ma	Eocene	Rio Grande Rift begins to form.
20 Ma	Miocene	San Andreas Fault comes into being as the North American plate begins splitting the Farallon plate in two.
17 Ma - 14 Ma	Miocene	Columbia River Basalt Group forms.
8 Ma	Miocene	Onset of faulting creating the Basin and Range geologic province.
5 Ma	Miocene - Pliocene	Northward propagation of the East Pacific Rise into the North American plate initiates rifting off of the Baja California peninsula.
4 Ma	Pliocene	Sierra Nevada begins to rise.
3.5 Ma	Pliocene	The Pacific plate changes its direction of motion about 11 degrees east of its previous heading, from northwest to the present northwest by north.
