= Allochthon =

Large block of rock which has been moved from its original site of formation

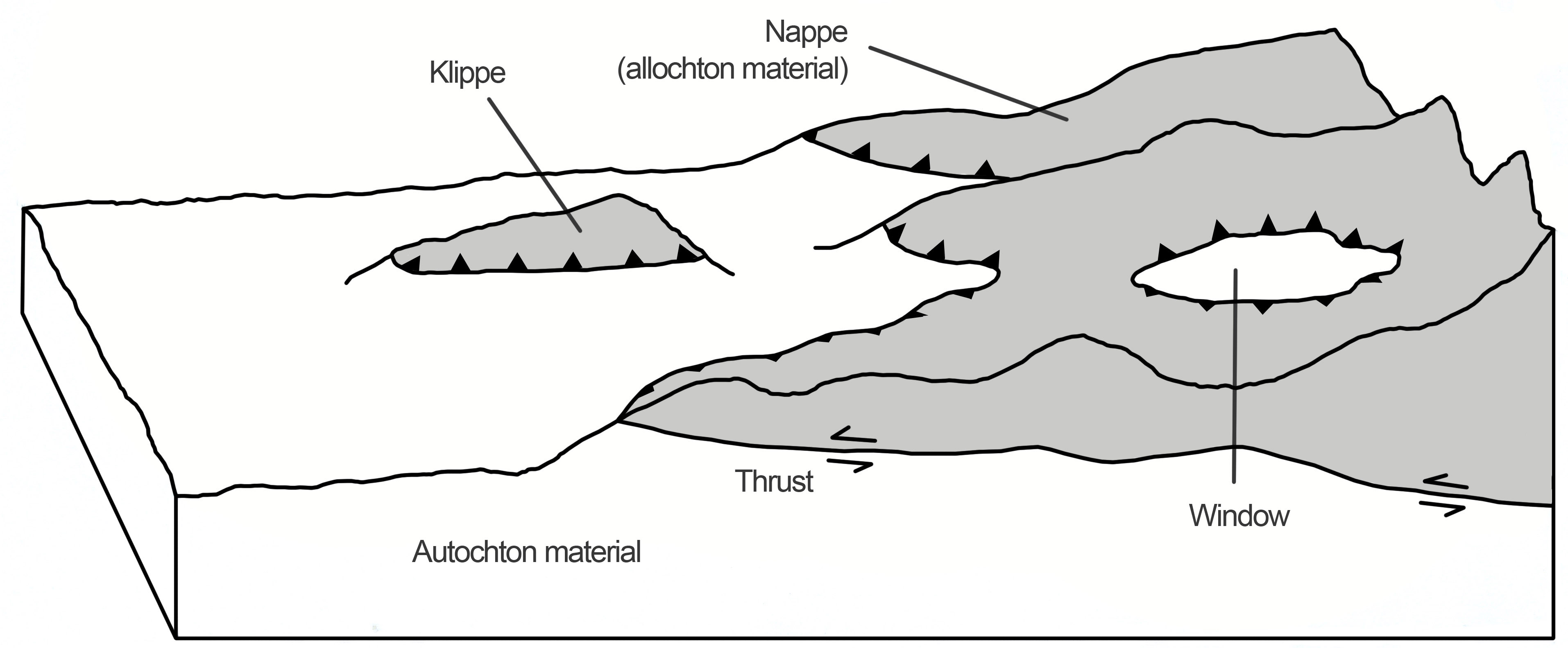
Schematic overview of a thrust system. The hanging wall block is (when it has reasonable proportions) called a nappe. If an erosional hole is created in the nappe that is called a window. A klippe is a solitary outcrop of the nappe in the middle of autochthonous material.

An allochthon, or an allochthonous block, is a large block of rock which has been moved from its original site of formation, usually by low angle thrust faulting. The term is derived from Greek: allo, meaning other, and chthon, meaning earth. For other possible mechanisms see obduction.

An allochthon which is isolated from the rock that pushed it into position is called a klippe. If an allochthon has a "hole" in it so that one can view the autochthon beneath the allochthon, the hole is called a "window" (or fenster). In generalized terms, the term is applied to any geologic units that originated at a distance from their present location.

In the United States there are three notable allochthons, all of which were displaced nearly 50 km (31 miles) along thrust faults. The Golconda and Robert Mountains allochthons are both found in Nevada, a product of the Antler orogeny in the late Devonian period. Another is the Taconic allochthons found in New York, Massachusetts and Vermont formed from the collision of the Taconic magmatic arc with the super-continent Laurentia in the late Cambrian period.

== See also ==
- Accretion (geology)
- Continental collision
- Orogeny
