= Sonomia terrane =

Crustal block accreted onto the North American Plate in Northwest Nevada

The Sonomia terrane is a geologic crustal block known as a "terrane" whose remnants are today centered in northwest Nevada, and extends into western California, southeastern Oregon, and a small sliver of Idaho. The terrane acquired its name from the Sonoma Range in that region. The Sonomia terrane is associated with the Golconda Thrust, a structure named for its proximity to the town of Golconda, Nevada. The Sonoma orogeny was caused by the accretion of the Sonomia microcontinent onto western North America during the mid-Triassic.

== See also ==
- Geologic timeline of Western North America
- Smartville Block, a terrane that arrived after the Sonomia
