= Galisteo Formation =

Geologic formation in New Mexico, USA

- Stratigraphic range: Duchesnean; ~42–38 Ma
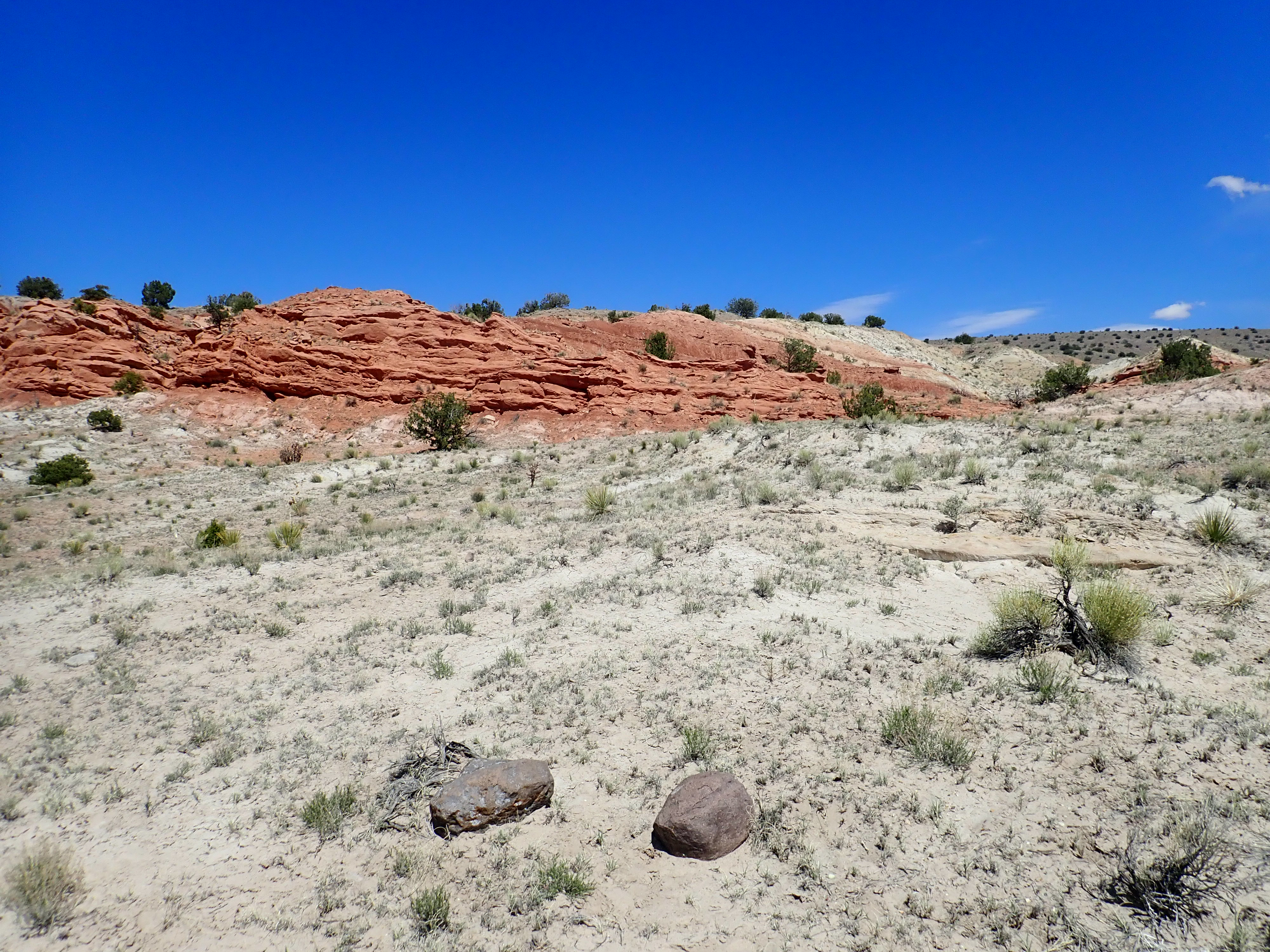
- Galisteo Formation near Espinaso Ridge, New Mexico
- Type: Formation
- Underlies: Espinaso Formation
- Overlies: Diamond Tail Formation
- Area: Galisteo Basin
- Thickness: 979 m (3,212 ft)

Lithology
- Primary: Sandstone
- Other: Mudstone

Location
- Coordinates: 35.3914561°N 105.9767794°W
- Approximate paleocoordinates: 37.4°N 97.4°W
- Region: New Mexico
- Country: United States

Type section
- Named for: Galisteo Creek
- Named by: Hayden
- Year defined: 1869
- Galisteo Formation (the United States) Galisteo Formation (New Mexico)

The Galisteo Formation is a geologic formation in New Mexico. It contains fossils characteristic of the Bartonian stage of the Eocene epoch, Duchesnean in the NALMA classification.

== Description ==
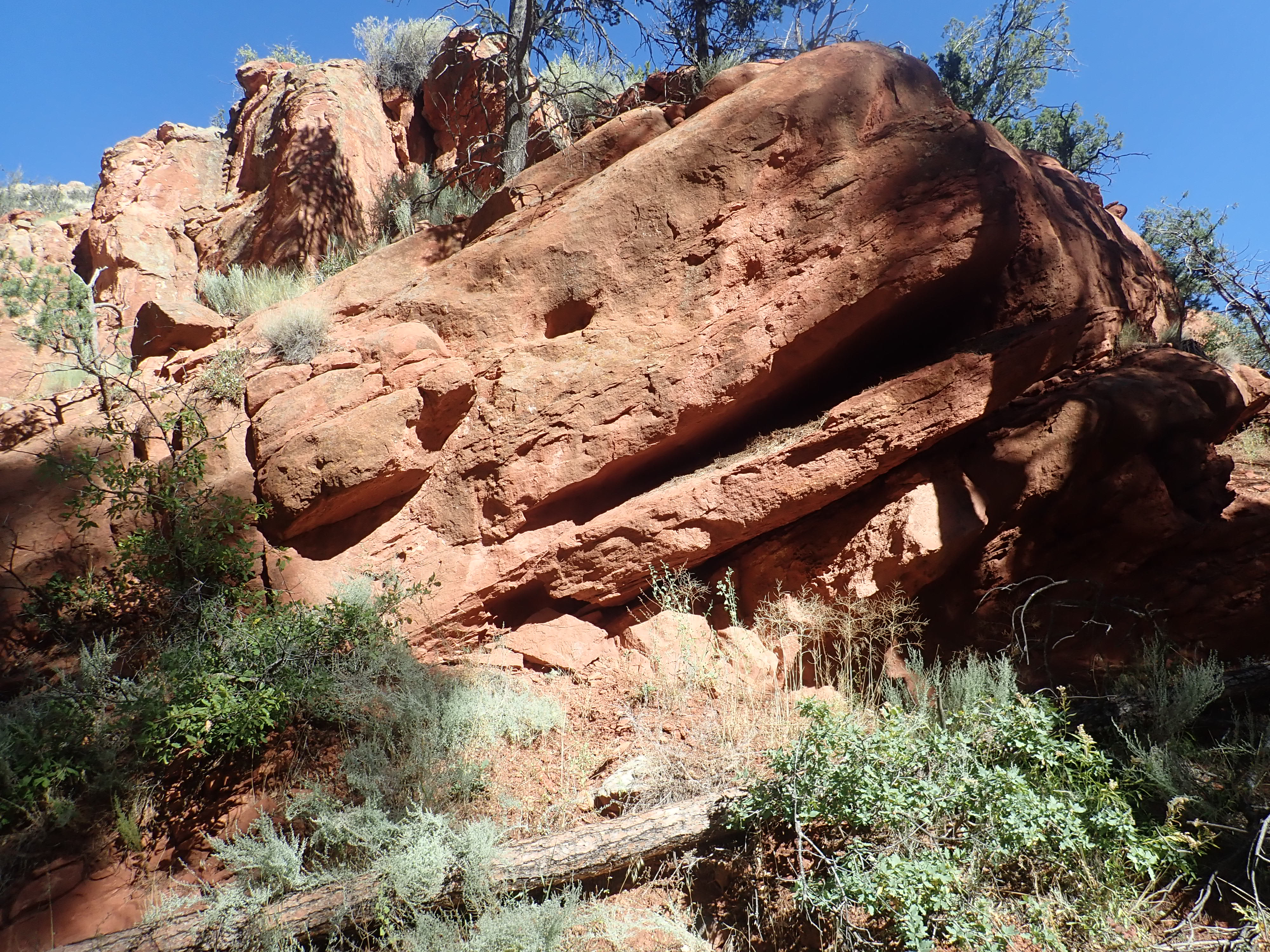
Galisteo Formation in western Bandelier National Monument

The Galisteo Formation is primarily fluvial sandstone and mudstone, with small amounts of conglomerate, freshwater limestone, and sedimentary tuff. It crops out over a limited area between Sandia Crest and the southern Sangre de Cristo Mountains, with an outlier at the eastern feet of the San Miguel subrange of the Jemez Mountains. Its contact with the overlying Espinaso Formation is gradational. The formation rests on the Diamond Tail Formation in most locations where its base is exposed, but the Diamond Tail is not present in the exposures south of San Ysidro. The presence of Precambrian and Paleozoic clasts at the base of the Galisteo Formation suggests that the discontinuity separating it from the Diamond Tail is tectonic in origin. There are indications the formation itself experienced penecontemporaneous deformation, possibly due to renewed uplift of the southern Sangre de Cristo Mountains. The maximum thickness of the formation is 979 meters (3,212 feet).

Paleocurrent directions indicate the sources of the sediments deposited in the formation came from the Brazos-Sangre de Cristo Geanticline to the northeast and the Nacimiento Mountains to the northwest. There are no indications of sediments from Sandia Crest to the south, suggesting that Sandia Crest was not uplifted until after the Eocene. The presence of Precambrian clasts in the upper part of the formation in the San Miguel Mountains was some of the first evidence for the existence of the Pajarito Uplift, a Laramide structure occupying what is now the southern Espanola Basin between the current locations of Los Alamos and Santa Fe that later foundered into the Rio Grande Rift.

The Galisteo Formation likely correlates with the El Rito Formation to the north of the Jemez Mountains. It may also correlate with the Tapicito Member of the San Jose Formation.

== Paleontology ==
The most important fossil site in the Galisteo Formation, the Stearns quarry at Arroyo del Tuerto, contains numerous fossil remains of titanotheres dating to the Duchesnean Stage, about 42 to 38 million years ago. Petrified wood is also found in this area. The formation is otherwise largely barren of fossils.

=== Fossil content ===
The following fossils have been reported from the formation:

==== Mammals ====
Carnivora

- Angelarctocyon cf. australis

Glires

- Paramyidae indet.

Pantodonta

- Coryphodon sp.

Perissodactyls

- cf. Homogalax protapirinus
- Brontotheriidae indet.
- Equidae indet.

Placentalia

- Hyopsodus powellianus

Primates

- Microsyopidae indet.

Theriiformes

- Ectoganus sp.

== History of investigation ==
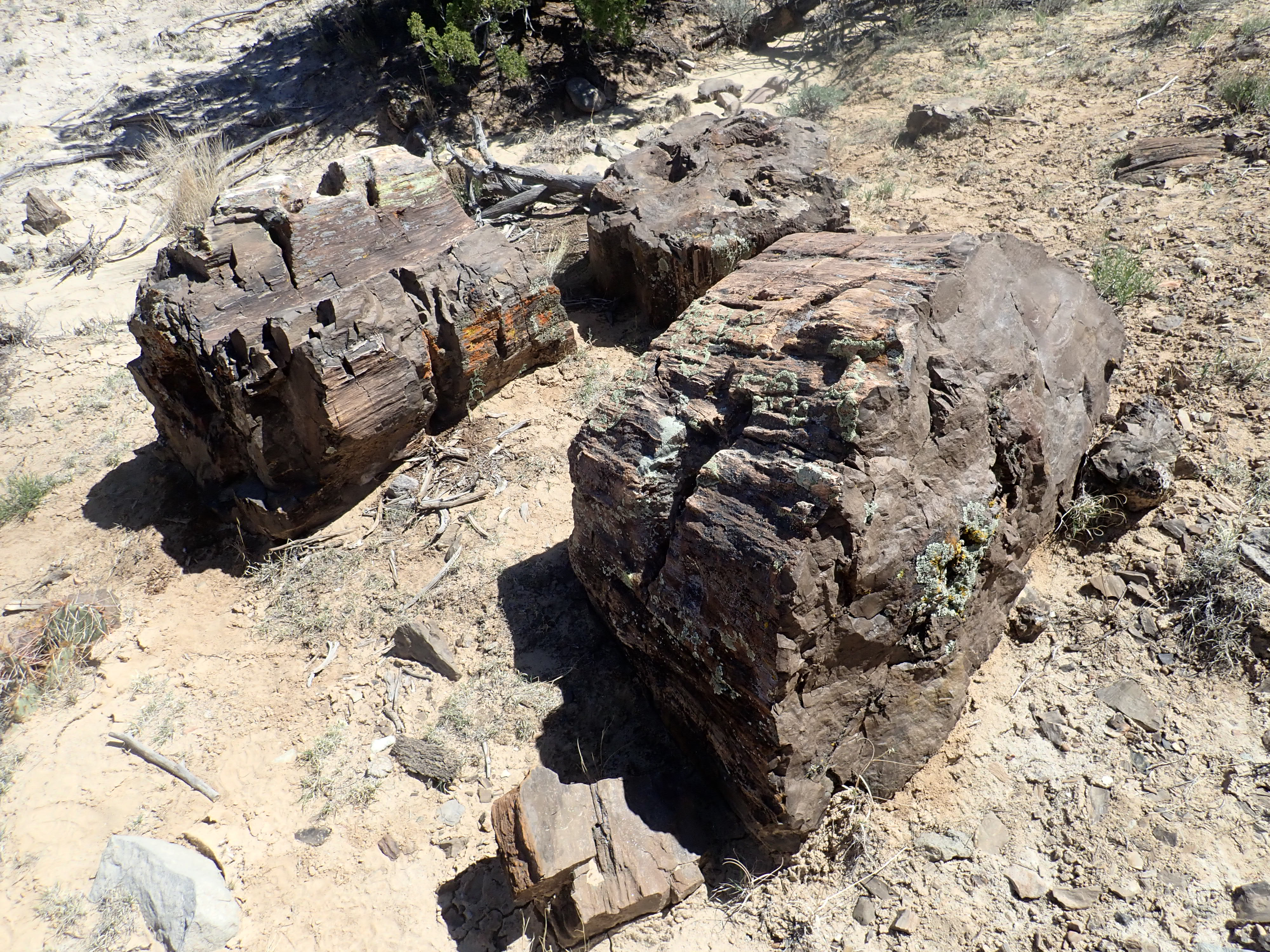
Petrified wood from the Galisteo Formation, Arroyo del Tuerto

The formation was first described by F.V. Hayden during the 1869 expedition to New Mexico and Colorado. He named the formation the Galisteo sand group and noted that its sandstone beds dipped from 5 to 50 degrees and varied in color from off-white to brick red. He could find no fossils other than petrified logs, some of which were enormous.

The formation originally included older beds separated from the rest of the formation by a significant disconformity. These were split off into the Diamond Tail Formation in 1997.

== See also ==
- List of fossiliferous stratigraphic units in New Mexico
- Paleontology in New Mexico
