= Russula stuntzii =

Scientific classification
- Kingdom: Fungi
- Division: Basidiomycota
- Class: Agaricomycetes
- Order: Russulales
- Family: Russulaceae
- Genus: Russula
- Species: R. stuntzii

Binomial name
- Russula stuntzii Grund

Species of fungus

Russula stuntzii
- Mycological characteristics
- Gills on hymenium
- Cap is convex or depressed
- Hymenium is adnate or adnexed
- Stipe is bare
- Spore print is white to yellow
- Edibility is unknown

Russula stuntzii, commonly known as the gray brittlegill, is a species of mushroom in the family Russulaceae. It is found in Western North America.

== Description ==
The cap of Russula stuntzii is whitish to gray in color and about 3.5-8 centimeters in diameter. It starts out round or convex and becomes broadly convex, flat, or depressed as the mushroom gets older. The gills are adnate to adnexed and white to cream-colored. The stipe is about 2-5 centimeters long and 0.5-1.5 centimeters wide. It is whitish in color. The spore print is white to yellowish, and the taste is acrid.

== Habitat and ecology ==
Russula stuntzii is found in conifer forests, where it grows under douglas fir and western hemlock. It can be found on rotten logs.
