= Geology of Nevada =

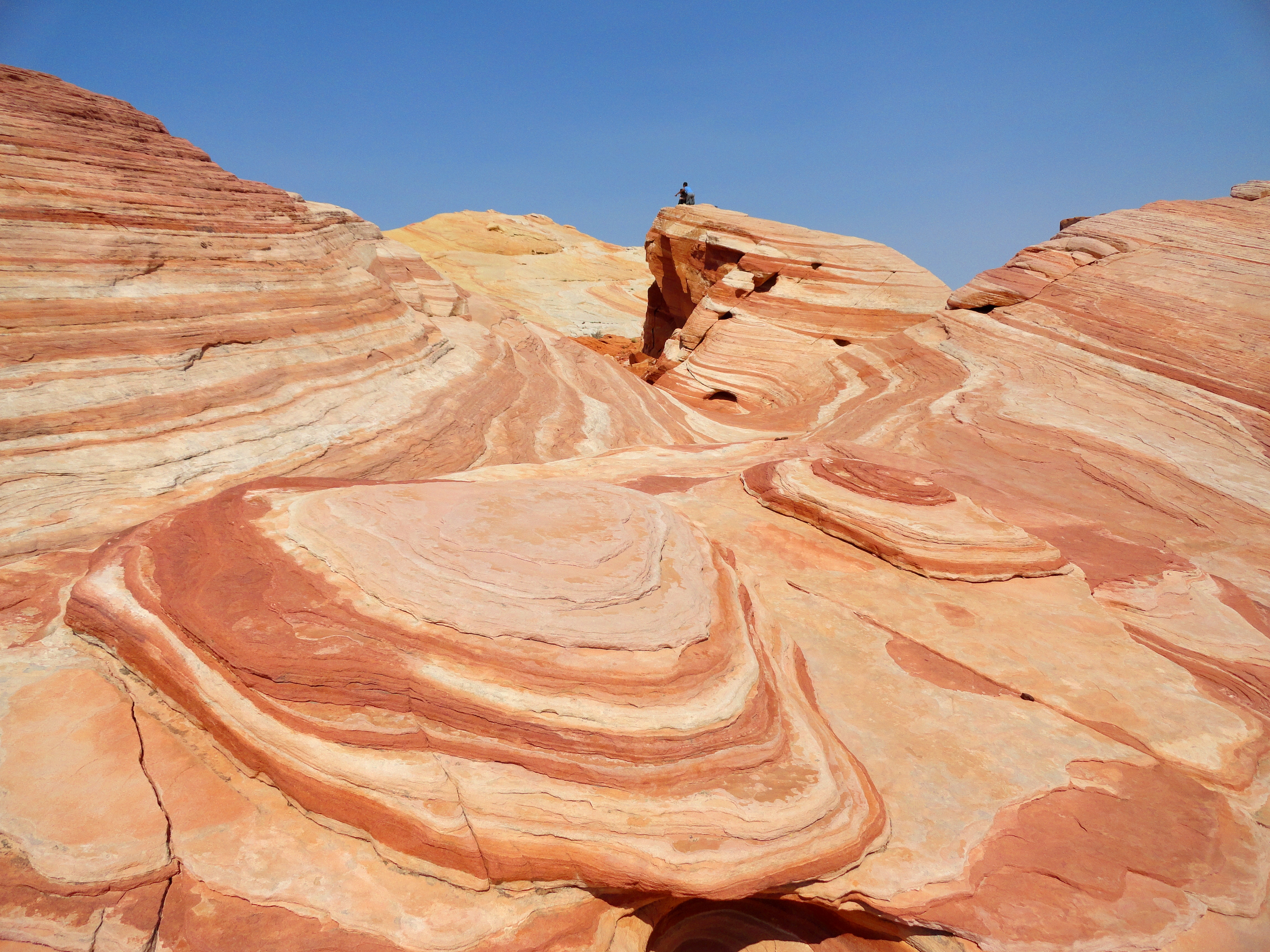
Valley of Fire near Las Vegas

The geology of Nevada began to form in the Proterozoic at the western margin of North America. Terranes accreted to the continent as a marine environment dominated the area through the Paleozoic and Mesozoic periods. Intense volcanism, the horst and graben landscape of the Basin and Range Province originating from the Farallon Plate, and both glaciers and valley lakes have played important roles in the region throughout the past 66 million years.

== Geologic history, stratigraphy, and tectonics ==
The oldest rocks in Nevada are in the East Humboldt Range in the northeast, with lead isotope data suggesting an age of 2.5 billion years, at the boundary of the Archean and Proterozoic. Metamorphic and igneous rocks formed 1.7 billion years ago underlie Clark County and the populous areas around Las Vegas. The region was part of the supercontinent Rodinia one billion years ago, situated at the equator.

The continent rifted apart between 700 and 600 million years ago. No continental rocks exist in western Nevada from more than 700 million years ago, because the western part of the region was rifted away, becoming part of current day Siberia.

=== Paleozoic (539-251 million years ago) ===
After the breakup of Rodinia, southern and eastern Nevada remained as a passive margin on the western edge of the proto-North American continent of Laurentia. Up to 20,000 feet of sediment accumulated along the new margin as it subsided, building up thick layers of sandstone, siltstone, limestone and dolomite. The Monitor, Egan, Schell Creek and Arrow Canyon ranges in the east are dominated by limestone and dolomite formed during 400 million years of marine conditions. Central Nevada by contrast, preserves shale, siltstone and chert formed under deep water conditions as fine ooze settled into deep water offshore.

Continental collisions began to form the supercontinent Pangea leading to subduction along the western margin of Laurentia. As plates subducted, they spurred intense volcanic and tectonic activity, and volcanic island arcs and carbonate platforms accreted against the western shore. Dozens of terranes accumulated over 250 million year and many rock units were thrust on top of others as thrust sheets along thrust faults. Large granite bodies formed from magma.

The Antler Orogeny, named by geologists in 1951 after Antler Peak on Battle Mountain, was an early orogeny mountain building event in the creation of the Basin and Range Province. The Antler highland, including the Roberts Mountains, formed as fractured deep ocean sediments were thrust upward. For the most part, the Antler Orogeny occurred in the Devonian and Mississippian, although it may have continued longer.

One terrane that may have driven the orogeny is the Nolan Belt, an intensely folded mass of quartzite, schist and slate extending from Esmeralda County to the north, through central Nevada as far as the Mountain City and Bull Run Mountain area near Idaho.

Hinterland and foreland basins filled with sediments as the Antler highland eroded. Sea levels rose over the eroded mountains in the late Paleozoic, although uneven rock surfaces remain as the Antler overlap sequence, which includes conglomerate, siltstone, limestone and sandstone deposited from the Pennsylvanian into the early Triassic.

High concentrations of the rare element iridium and jumbled mega-breccia deposits in the Guilmette Formation, made up of shattered limestone that re-cemented in deep water, has led geologists to infer the Alamo meteorite impact even around 382 million years ago in the Devonian. Distinct gravel rubble is common in late Devonian rocks in the area, suggesting large tsunamis. Although an exact impact site has not been found, geologists have suggested a possible location in the Timpahute Range in southern Lincoln County, near Rachel, Nevada. Based on the distribution of debris, estimates suggest a crater one mile deep and 30 miles in diameter. Terranes continued to accrete, driving the Humboldt orogeny, first recognized in rocks in the Pinon Range in 1977, and Permian-Triassic Sonoma orogeny.

During the Sonomo orogeny, the Golconda allochthon, a thick sequence of metamorphosed basalt, siltstone, shale, chert and limestone, was thrust on top of the Antler overlap sequence. It is named for the Golcondo Summit, where US Interstate 80 crosses Edna Mountain. Sonomia, the superterrane added to the region, includes several smaller terranes, including Walker Lake, Pine Nut and Paradise.

=== Mesozoic (251-66 million years ago) ===
Plate convergence continued through the Mesozoic, with the addition of the Black Rock-Jackson terrane in the Jurassic and Cretaceous now present in northwest Nevada. The terrane rocks are volcanic or sedimentary and originated offshore in the Paleozoic and Triassic. By the end of the Mesozoic, dry land conditions prevailed across Nevada.

The Farallon Plate transported the terranes and subducted under North America in the Cretaceous. Numerous thrust faults developed due to compressional strain, placing older rocks on top of younger units. In the northwest, the Luning-Fencemaker thrust fault developed in the Jurassic and thrust the Jungo terrane to the east, forming the undulating Nevadaplano. As the Farallon Plate subducted, the Sevier Orogeny generated large mountain ranges in the east.

=== Cenozoic (66 million years ago-present) ===
In the Mesozoic, the subducting Farallon Plate had produced magma and played a role in building the Sierra Nevada mountains, but by 60 million years ago in the Cenozoic, its downward angle decreased and it moved further eastward without producing magma. The plate produced shear stress at the base of the North American Plate, driving the Laramide orogeny, which created the Rocky Mountains. Due to conditions in the underlying crust, inferred to be a thinner section of the Farallon, intense volcanic activity began in the Eocene in northern Nevada around 43 million years ago, reaching the center of the state by the Oligocene and the south by the Miocene. The volcanism was some of the most intense in Earth history, ejecting 17,000 cubic miles of material in 250 major eruptions and layering the landscape in tuff ash falls thousands of feet thick. Extinct calderas up to 35 miles wide are preserved in the mountains of south-central Nevada, particularly near the Tonopah range, as well as in the Hot Creek, Monitor, Reveille and Kawich ranges. Welded ignimbrite formed as hot ash formed natural glass on rock surfaces.

Violent volcanism continued in the southwest until seven million years ago, forming the ancestral Cascade arc, named for its similarity to the Cascade Range in the Pacific Northwest. Additionally, the Walker Lane—an area of northwest trending right-lateral strike-slip faults formed 12 million years ago—associated with some of the most intense eruptions, such as the 16 to 6.5 million year old Southwest Nevada volcanic field.

During the last 10 million years, volcanic activity shifted to bimodal volcanism with basalt lava flows alternating with rhyolite domes. Dark gray to black basalt and pink or brown rhyolite are particularly common in Elko, Washoe and Humboldt counties. Some small cinder cones formed as recently as the Pleistocene and the Nye County Lunar Crater volcanic field was active only 15,000 years ago. In Nevada's recent geologic past, tectonic changes have created normal faults and creating the basin and range horst and graben terrain. Thinning of the upper crust caused deeper, highly metamorphosed rock masses to rise to the surface, where it is overlain by younger faulted and domed rocks. There are more than 24 metamorphic core complexes in the Basin and Range Province as a whole. In some cases, faulted blocks have shifted more than 50 miles from the apex of the dome. Along detachment surfaces, mylonite forms due to shear. The Ruby Mountains-East Humboldt, close to Elko, and the Northern Snake Range, close to Utah, are the two most researched core complexes.

At the time of the Pleistocene glaciations, Nevada experienced temperatures up to 15 degrees Fahrenheit lower, eight inches more of annual rainfall and lower evaporation. Although it was drier overall than many neighboring areas, glaciers did form in the Ruby Mountains and East Humboldt Range. Small areas of eastern Nevada in the White Pine, Grant Ranges, Snake and Schell Creek mountains were also glaciated, along with the Toquima, Toiyabe and Monitor Ranges in the center of the state. Geologists debate whether the 11,918 foot tall Charleston Peak was glaciated as well.

Dozens of large lakes filled the valleys in the region, accumulating fine silt and developing alkaline chemical conditions that precipitated tufa calcium carbonate mounds. Lake Lahontan in the northwest was the largest lake overall and flooded up to 8600 square miles 14,000 years ago. The lake grew in three different phases, with volcanic ash and silt at its bottom. Today, Pyramid Lake is a remnant of Lahontan, where it was once over 900 feet deep. Elsewhere, Clover, Franklin and Waring lakes developed near the Ruby Mountains. Lake Railroad occupied Railroad Valley, while Lake Toiyabe and Lake Desatoya formed in Big Smoky Valley and Smith Creek Valley respectively.

== Natural resource geology ==
Mining and mineral resources have played an important role in the state's past and present economy. Named the Silver State for silver deposits which spurred early settlement and statehood in the 1800s, Nevada is today the leading producer of gold in the US, mining five million ounces annually. In 2012, $10.5 billion of materials were mined, directly employing over 15,000 people.

Gold-bearing skarn in the Battle Mountain region of northeast Nevada is an important target for mining. Up to 263 polymetallic veins contain sphalerite, galena, jamesonite and tetrahedrite. Polymetallic molybdenum, antimony, uranium, copper, gold zinc, lead and silver ores have been mined in the Reese River area since the 1800s.

In 1961, Carlin-type gold deposits were discovered near Carlin, Nevada. Paleozoic limestone, formed at the ancient continental margin, contains nearly microscopic gold associated with pyrite and arsenic sulfides and particularly jasperoid in folds and faults. Over 200 million ounces of gold are known to be distributed in more than 100 Carlin-type deposits. The Carlin trend extends from the Pinon Range to the Tuscarora Mountains, an area 70 miles long and 10 miles wide. Epithermal, skarn, vein and Carlin-type deposits are also found in the neighboring Battle Mountain-Eureka trend to the southwest. Other sites of mining and mineralization include the Independence trend and Walker Lane trend.

Nevada is the leading producer of barite in the US, particularly at the Greystone Mine in Lander County, where it is found in deep sea black shale and argillite.
