= Autochthon (geology) =

Large mass of rock in the place of its original formation relative to its foundation rock

An autochthon in structural geology is a large block or mass of rock which is in the place of its original formation relative to its basement or foundation rock. The word is derived from Greek: autos means self, and chthon means earth.

It can be described as rooted to its basement rock as opposed to an allochthonous block or nappe which has been relocated from its site of formation. Autochthonous sediment is sediment found at or very close to its site of deposition.

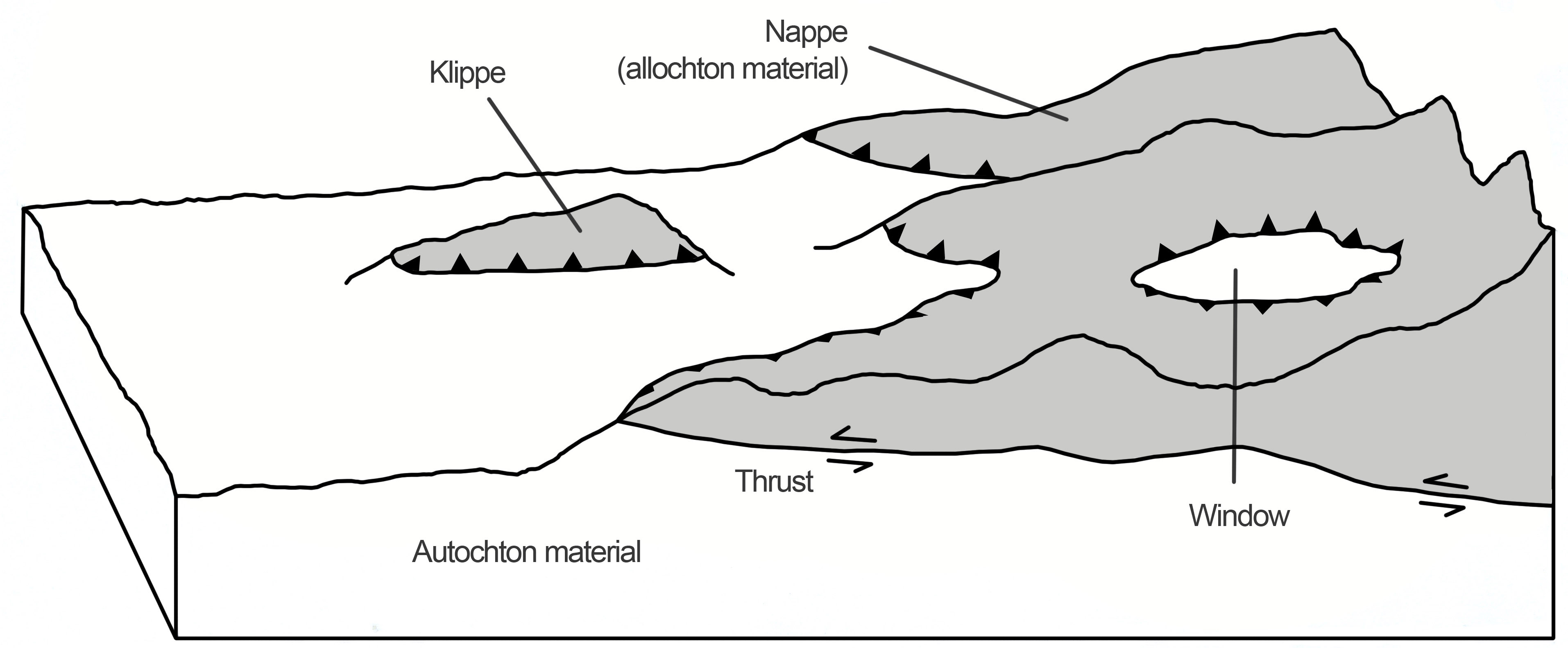
Schematic overview of a thrust system. The hanging wall block is (when it has reasonable proportions) called a nappe which overlays the autochthonous (unrelocated) material. A hole in the nappe which exposes the underlying autochthonous material is called a window. A klippe is a solitary outcrop of the nappe in the middle of autochthonous material.

While an autochthon may have experienced some minor shifting, an allochthonous block will have moved at least a few kilometres. If an overlying allochthon has an opening or hole which exposes the underlying autochthonous material, the hole is called a window or fenster.

== See also ==
- Tectonics
