= Rescue Lineament-Bear Mountains fault zone =

The Rescue Lineament-Bear Mountains fault zone, in eastern California, is a series of co-axial faults located in the western foothills of the Sierra Nevada (mountain range).

The fault zone represents an ancient suture, the boundary where an ancient oceanic crustal block known as an exotic terrane, named by geologists the Smartville Block, collided with and attached to the North American plate.

Gold

To the west of the ancient suture/fault zone the Mother Lode, of the California Gold Rush, was found in the Smartville Block's Ophiolite oceanic crust material.
