= Espanola basin =

Structural basin in northern New Mexico, US

Coordinates: 35°54′N 106°06′W

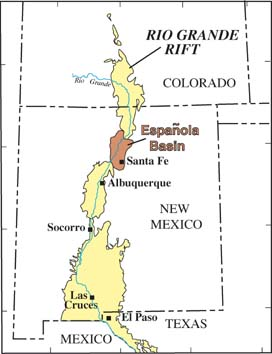
Map showing the location of the Espanola Basin withine the Rio Grande rift, New Mexico, US

The Espanola basin is a structural basin in northern New Mexico. It is located in the Rio Grande watershed and is part of the Rio Grande rift. The definition of its boundaries is not fully settled, but the basin is usually defined such that it includes the cities of Santa Fe, Los Alamos, and Espanola.

== Geology ==
The basin is part of the Rio Grande rift, a north-south sequence of structural basins that have developed where tectonic forces have pulled the Colorado Plateau away from the interior of North America. The basin is partially filled with sediments eroded from the higher ground to the east and west or brought in by the ancestral Rio Grande. The Jemez volcanic field is located on the western margin of the basin and has contributed additional volcanic sediments to the basin. The sediments formed the Tesuque Formation and Chamita Formation of the Santa Fe Group.

The basin began forming during the middle to late Oligocene, around 25 million years ago. The early basin was more extensive than the present basin, and there is no evidence of boundary faults at this stage of development. The basin was likely a shallow depression between the Sierra Nacimiento to the west and the Sangre de Cristo Mountains to the east. Faulting and volcanism began on the west side of the basin in mid-Miocene time, around 14 million years ago. In the early Pliocene, rifting became focused on the Velarde graben, which is bounded on the west by the Pajarito fault zone. This is located on the western edge of the city of Los Alamos, at the feet of the Jemez Mountains.

The basin is an asymmetric half-graben, with the beds within the basin dipping to the west. No major bounding faults are found on the east side of the basin. The accumulated sediments in the center of the basin are about 2 to 3 km thick, becoming thinner to the east and pinching out against the Precambrian rock of the Sangre de Cristo Mountains. At greater depths near the basin center, there is are thick beds of older sedimentary rock that may be an old lake deposit of the Eocene Galisteo or El Rito Formations. The deepest portion of the rift is along the Velarde graben, which is up to 5 km deep.

The Rio Grande became established in the basin in the Pliocene, around 4 million years ago. Volcanic activity in the Cerros del Rio periodically dammed the river and created a large lake in the Espanola basin.

== Fossils ==
The Espanola basin has yielded vertebrate fossils since the 1870s, which provide the most extensive Miocene fossil record in New Mexico. Most of the fossils are mammals, but lizard and turtle fossils have also been recovered, along with freshwater diatoms.

== Economic resources ==
The sediments beneath the basin form a major regional aquifer supplying water to most residents of the basin. This aquifer is under stress from urban development and drought and the basin has been heavily studied to permit better management of this resource.

Geophysical measurements show a deep layer of sedimentary rock in the basin, and this has been the target of exploratory drilling for petroleum. However, the beds were found to most likely be relatively young (Eocene) lake sediments rather than the petroleum-bearing Mesozoic or Paleozoic beds that were hoped for.
