= Sonoma orogeny =

The Sonoma orogeny was a period of mountain building in western North America. The exact age and structure of the Sonoma orogeny is controversial. The orogeny is generally thought to have occurred during the Permian / Triassic transition, around 250 million years ago, following the Late Devonian Antler orogeny. The Sonoma orogeny was one of a sequence of accretionary events along the Cordilleran margin, possibly caused by the closure of the basin between the island arc of Sonomia and the North American continent. Evidence of this event has been reported throughout western North America, but most distinctly in northwest Nevada.

The orogeny was named by Silberling and Roberts, who identified it with the Havallah Formation, originally thought to date to the Pennsylvanian and Permian ages but has since been revised to include rocks of Late Devonian and Mississippian age. Some geologists dispute whether convergent plate tectonics produced the Sonoma orogeny.

== Stratigraphy ==
The Havallah sequence is the informal name for sequence including the Havallah Formation and other related strata. The Havallah sequence is universally associated with the Sonoma orogeny, but units of the same age range and roughly the same lithic composition, along the western and northern margins of the Havallah, are also relevant. These units include the Inskip Formation in the East Range and a series of formations in the Hot Springs Range. These units consist of basalt, felsite, bedded chert, limestone, and detrital rocks ranging from conglomerate to argillite that accumulated in a trough west of the Antler orogenic belt.

The Havallah sequence is underlain by the Golconda thrust, and is therefore a component of the Golconda allochthon. Speed observed that there are no arc-derived sedimentary rocks in the Golconda allochthon.

== Theories ==
Dickinson expanded the reach of the Sonoma orogeny as follows: segments of accreted Permian island arcs, composed of volcanic and volcaniclastic strata and paired geotectonically with Sonoma accretionary prisms to the east, are present in the Klamath-Sierran region of the Cordilleran orogen to the south of volcanic cover in the Pacific Northwest.

Burchfiel and Davis presented a detailed model relating the Sonoma orogeny to convergent plate tectonic processes. They postulated an east-dipping subduction zone beneath a magmatic arc to the west of the continent. In this scheme, a back-arc basin floored by oceanic crust lay between the arc and the continent. The Sonoma orogeny involved closure of this basin and a process by which the blanket of oceanic sedimentary rocks (the Havallah sequence) was obducted onto the continental shelf via the Golconda thrust. To account for the absence of oceanic crust in the obducted rocks, Davis later proposed the unique concept that the Havallah was separated from the underlying oceanic crust by a process of subduction and obduction. Silberling presented a model similar to that of Burchfiel and Davis

Miller and others found that the Schoonover sequence, a northern correlative of the Havallah sequence, was compatible with a back-arc thrusting model for the Sonoma orogeny.

Speed offered a distinctly different model involving a volcanic arc above a west-dipping subduction zone to the west of the continent. In this model, an expanse of oceanic crust subducted westward under the volcanic arc, causing the overlying sedimentary rocks of the Havallah sequence to be scraped off the descending plate and forced over the approaching continental slope. Snyder and Brueckner supported the Speed model with detailed lithic descriptions of the Havallah. They interpreted the lithic composition of the Havallah to be the sedimentary floor of an extensive ocean basin. Brueckner and Snyder expressed some uncertainty about the exact time of final emplacement of the allochthon, but emphasized that structures associated with the Sonoma orogeny had a long history from the middle Paleozoic to the Permian-Triassic periods.

=== Controversy and new ideas ===
Stewart and others revisited the classic Havallah locality at China Mountain in the Tobin Range, making use of a large number of fossil collections. This locality had been cited by Silberling and Roberts as displaying the best evidence for the existence of the Sonoma orogeny, having been tightly folded and thrust-faulted and overlain unconformably by the Triassic Koipato Formation. However, according to Stewart and others, the Havallah at that location is not tightly folded but is composed of nearly homoclinal strata separated by numerous undated faults sub-parallel to bedding. Stewart and others also cast some doubt as to the nature of the contact with the overlying Koipato Formation indicating on their map of the area that it could be a fault.

In the East Range just to the west of China Mountain, Whitebread mapped the contact between strata of Permian age, at the top of the Havallah, and the base of the overlying Koipato as parallel, indicating a lack of evidence for an orogeny at the Permian-Triassic boundary.

Ketner, in a complete reversal of the conventional concepts of the Sonoma orogeny, combined all similar deep-water Upper Devonian to Permian sequences in the area of the type Havallah sequence into a single genetic assemblage. Ketner concluded that Paleozoic deposits were compressed in the Jurassic, with the east-verging Golconda thrust in the east, and west-verging thrusts in western parts of the depositional basin. Ketner's work denied the oceanic origin of the Havallah and related sequences, eliminated the necessity for convergent plate tectonics and a far-traveled allochthon, established the age of the Golconda thrust as post-Triassic, and cast doubt on the very existence of the Sonoma orogeny.
