= Diamond Tail Formation =

Geologic formation in New Mexico, USA

- Stratigraphic range: late Paleocene–early Eocene
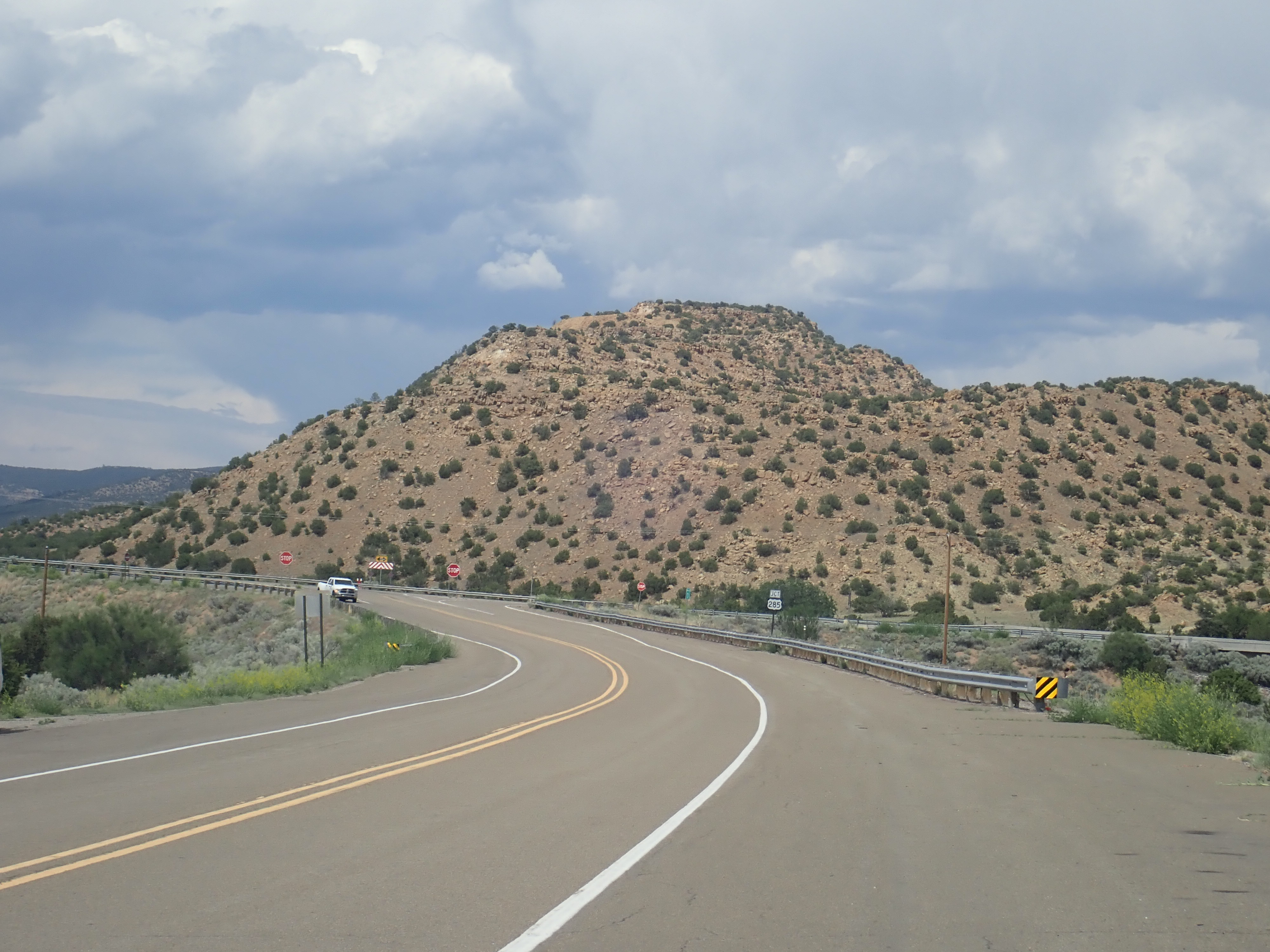
- Exposure of Diamond Tail Formation on Cerro Colorado, near Lamy, New Mexico
- Type: Formation
- Underlies: Galisteo Formation
- Overlies: Menefee Formation
- Thickness: 442 m (1,450 ft)

Lithology
- Primary: Sandstone
- Other: Mudstone

Location
- Region: Central New Mexico
- Country: United States

Type section
- Named for: Diamond Tail Ranch
- Named by: Lucas, Cather, Abbott, and Williamson
- Year defined: 1997
- Diamond Tail Formation (the United States) Diamond Tail Formation (New Mexico)

The Diamond Tail Formation is a geologic formation in New Mexico. It contains fossils characteristic of the late Paleocene or early Eocene.

== Description ==
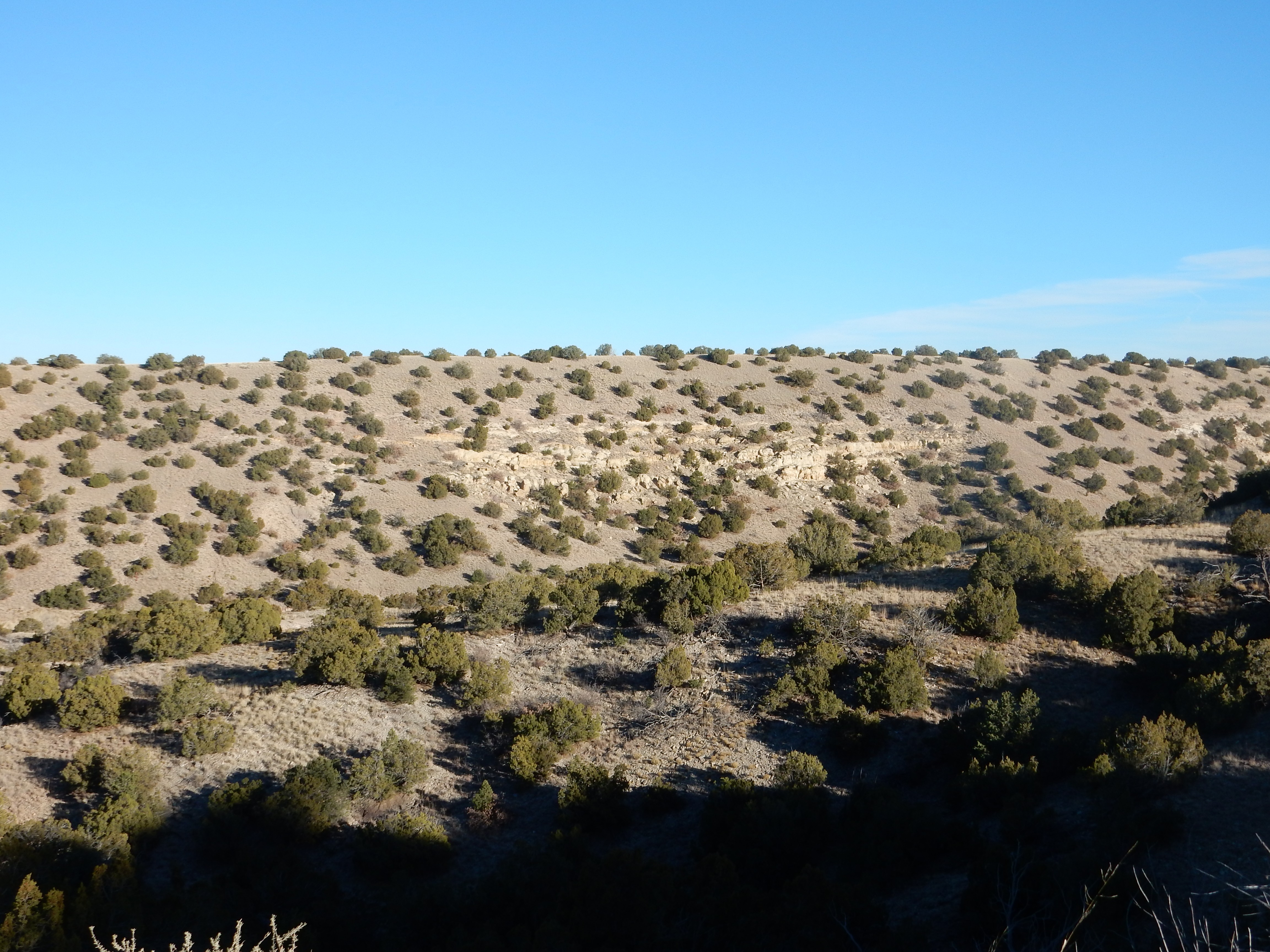
Diamond Tail Formation near Los Cerros, New Mexico

The Diamond Tail Formation consists of a lower member composed of sandstone and conglomeratic sandstone, a middle member of variegated mudstone, and an upper sandstone member. The formation crops out over a limited area between Sandia Crest and the southern Sangre de Cristo Mountains.

The formation is cut by thrust and strike-slip faults consistent with east-northeast to east-trending tectonic compression of the late stages of the Laramide Orogeny.

The formation likely correlates with the lower San Jose Formation of the San Juan Basin.

== Fossils ==
The presence of Hyracotherium teeth dates the formation to the late Paleocene or early Eocene.

== History ==
The beds now designated as the Diamond Tail Formation were originally part of F.V. Hayden's Galisteo sand group. By 1997, it was clear that these beds were separated from the remainder of the Galisteo by a significant regional unconformity, and they were split off into the Diamond Tail Formation, named after exposures near Diamond Tail Ranch.

== See also ==
- List of fossiliferous stratigraphic units in New Mexico
- Paleontology in New Mexico
