= Rio Grande rift =

Continental rift zone in the southwest United States

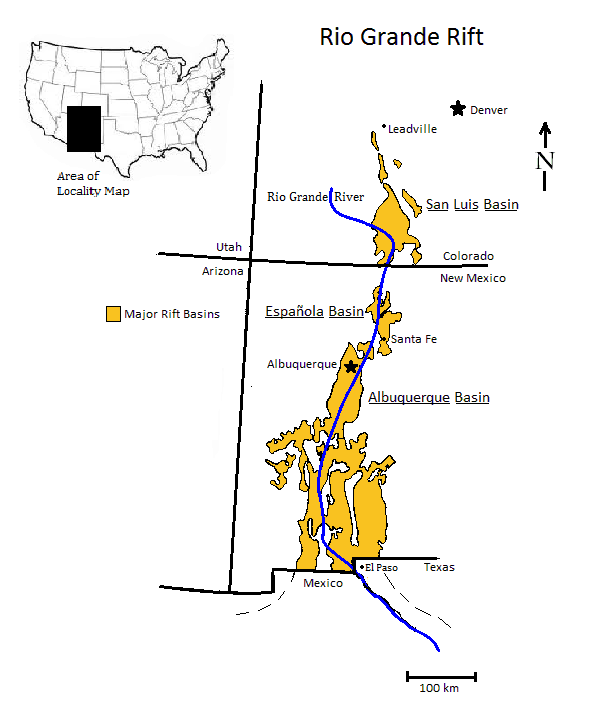
Locality map showing the Rio Grande rift extending from southern Colorado to Chihuahua, Mexico. The Rio Grande follows this rift for much of its course.

The Rio Grande rift is a north-trending continental rift zone. It separates the Colorado Plateau in the west from the interior of the North American craton on the east. The rift extends from central Colorado in the north to the state of Chihuahua, Mexico, in the south. The rift zone consists of four basins that have an average width of 31 miles (50 km). The rift can be observed on location at Rio Grande National Forest, White Sands National Park, Santa Fe National Forest, and Cibola National Forest, among other locations.

The Rio Grande rift has been an important site for humans for a long time, because it provides a north–south route that follows a major river. The Rio Grande follows the course of the rift from southern Colorado to El Paso, where it turns southeast and flows toward the Gulf of Mexico. Important cities, including Albuquerque, Santa Fe, Taos, Española, Las Cruces, El Paso, and Ciudad Juárez, lie within the rift.

== Geology ==
The Rio Grande rift represents the easternmost manifestation of widespread extension in the western U.S. during the past 35 million years. The rift consists of three major basins and many smaller basins, less than 39 square miles (100 km^{2}). The three major basins (from northernmost to southernmost) are the San Luis, Española, and Albuquerque basins. The rift's northern extent is delineated by the upper Arkansas River basin between Leadville and Salida, Colorado. Further south, the rift is defined by a network of smaller, less topographically distinct alternating basins and ranges. The distinction between these smaller basins and those of the Basin and Range Province becomes blurred in northern Mexico.

Basin size generally decreases to the north in the rift, though the Española covers approximately 75 miles (120 km) north–south and 25 miles (40 km) east–west, and the San Luis is roughly 75 by 50 miles (120 by 80 km). These basins may contain smaller units within them, such as the Alamosa basin within the San Luis, which is bounded by the San Juan and Tusas mountains on the west and the Sangre de Cristo Mountains in the east. The Albuquerque basin is the largest of the three basins, spanning 99 miles (160 km) north–south and 53 miles (86 km) east–west at its widest points. It is the oldest of the three major basins and contains 24,110 feet (7,350 m) of Paleogene clastic sediments deposited on Precambrian basement. The southernmost Albuquerque basin contains pre-rift volcanic deposits, while the central and northern portions contain volcanics erupted during rifting.

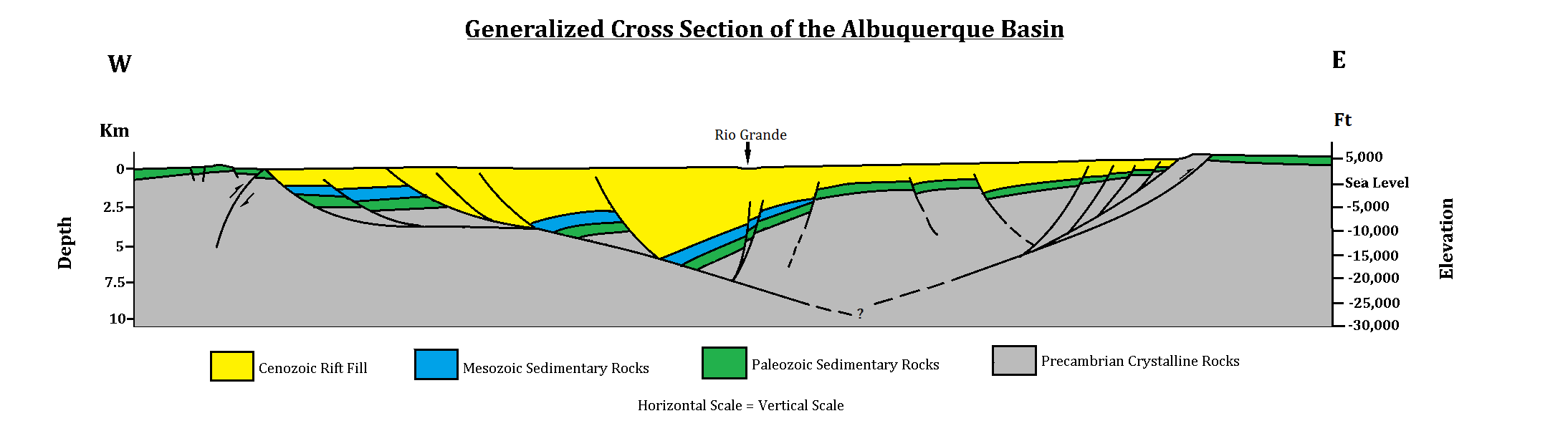
A generalized cross section of the Albuquerque Basin from east to west. Note the half-graben geometry, paleozoic and mesozoic sediments that existed pre-rift, and the large (up to 28%) amount of extension.

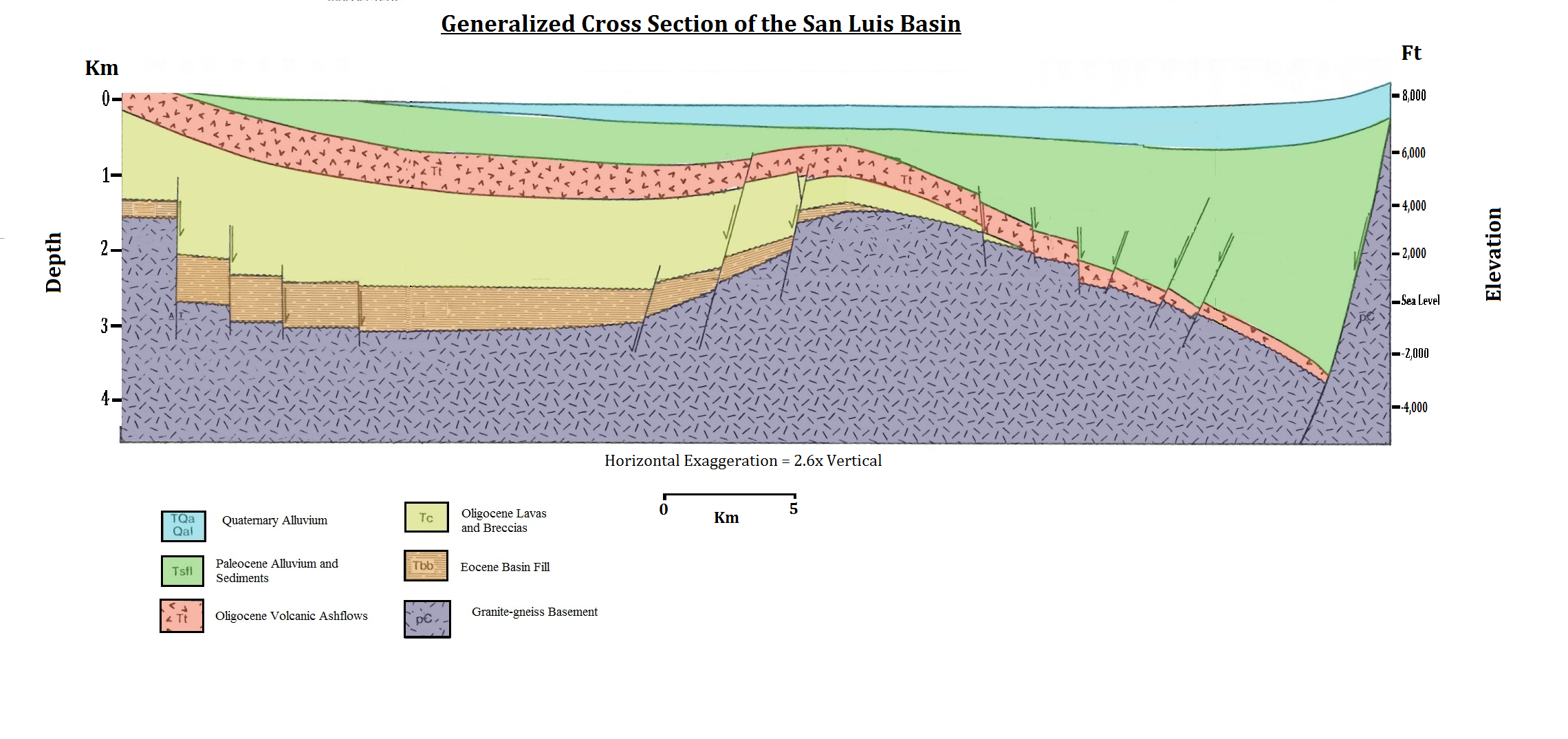
A generalized cross section of the San Luis basin from east to west. Being further north, this basin has experienced less extension (up to 12%). Also note the lack of pre-rift sediments and thinner profile.

In cross-section, the geometry of the basins within the rift are asymmetrical half-grabens, with major fault boundaries on one side and a downward hinge on the other. Which side of the basin has the major fault or the hinge alternates along the rift. The alternation between these half-grabens occurs along transfer faults, which trend across the rift to connect the major basin-bounding faults and occur between basins or, in places, within basins. The Precambrian basement changes relief sharply in this area, from 8,700 metres (28,500 ft) below sea level at the bottom of the Albuquerque Basin to 3,300 metres (10,800 ft) above sea level in the nearby Sandia Mountains, which flanks the Albuquerque Basin to the east. Flanking mountains are generally taller along the east side of the rift (although some of this relief may be Laramide in origin). The thickness of the crust increases to the north beneath the rift, where it may be as much as 3.1 miles (5 km) thicker than it is in the south. The crustal thickness underneath the rift is on average 19–22 miles (30–35 km), thinner by 6.2–9.3 miles (10–15 km) than the Colorado Plateau on the west and the Great Plains to the east.

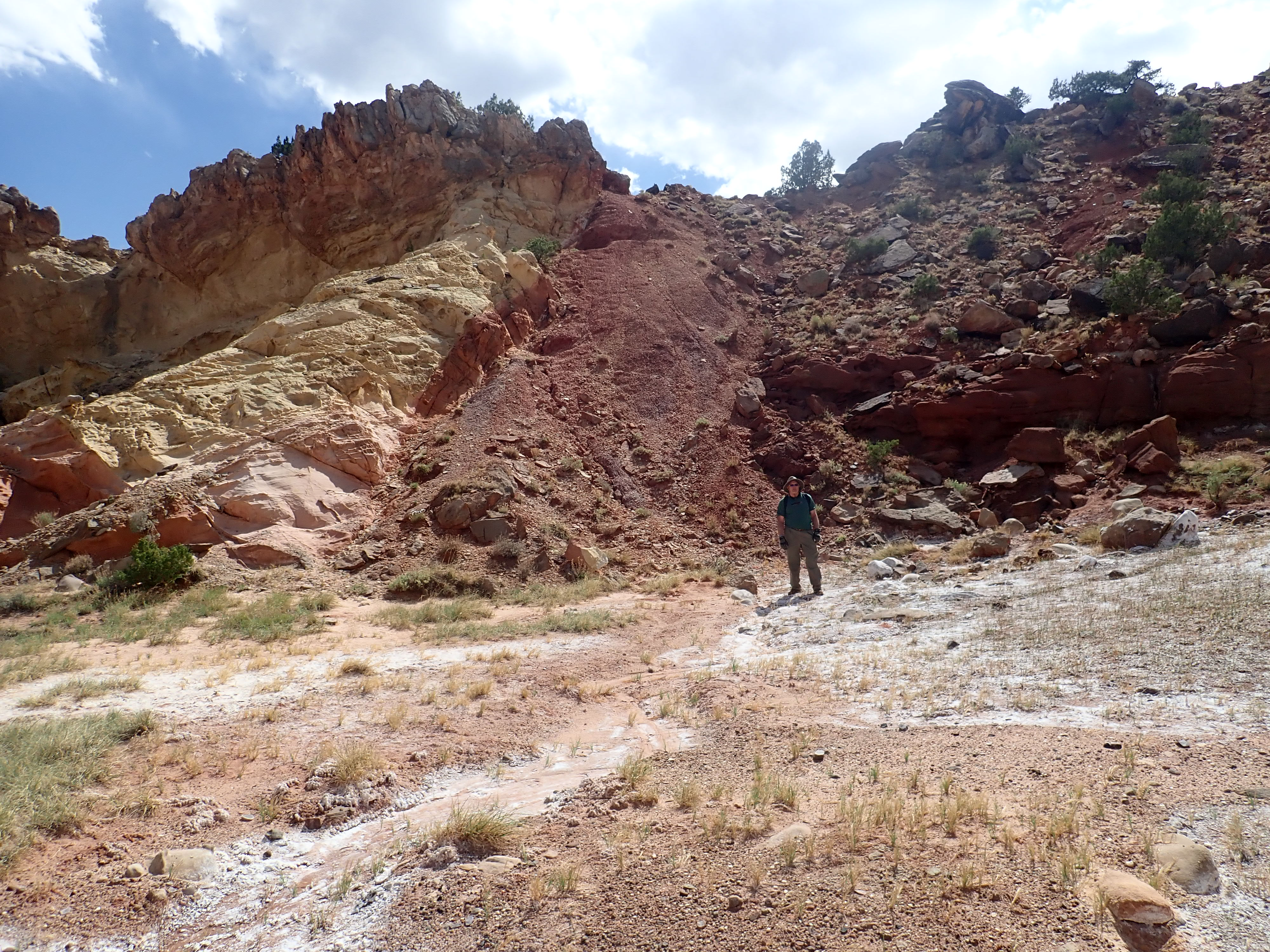
Cañones Fault on southeastern margin of Colorado Plateau, near Abiquiú, New Mexico

Formation of the rift began with significant deformation and faulting with offsets of many kilometers starting about 35 Ma. The largest-scale manifestation of rifting involves a pure-shear rifting mechanism, in which both sides of the rift pull apart evenly and slowly, with the lower crust and upper mantle (the lithosphere) stretching like taffy. This extension is associated with very low seismic velocities in the upper mantle above approximately 250 miles (400 km) depth associated with relatively hot mantle and low degrees of partial melting. This intrusion of the asthenosphere into the lithosphere and continental crust is thought to be responsible for nearly all of the volcanism associated with the Rio Grande rift.

The sedimentary fill of the basins consists largely of alluvial fan and mafic volcanic flows. The most alkalic lavas erupted outside the rift. The sediments that were deposited during rifting are commonly known as the Santa Fe Group. This group contains sandstones, conglomerates, and volcanics. Aeolian deposits are also present in some basins.

The Rio Grande rift is intersected in northern New Mexico by the NE-SW trending Jemez Lineament which extends well into Arizona. The lineament is defined by aligned volcanic fields and several calderas in the area, including the Valles Caldera National Preserve in the Jemez Mountains. The Jemez Lineament is thought to be a hydrous subduction zone scar, separating Precambrian basement rock of the Yavapai-Mazatzal transition zone from the Mazaztl Province proper. Also on the Colorado Plateau but further north lies the San Juan volcanic field in the San Juan Mountains of Colorado.

The youngest eruptions in the rift region are in the Valley of Fires, New Mexico, and are approximately 5,400 years old. The Socorro, New Mexico, region of the central rift hosts an inflating mid-crustal sill-like magma body at a depth of 19 km that is responsible for anomalously high earthquake activity in the vicinity, including the largest rift-associated earthquakes in historic times (two events of approximately magnitude 5.8) in July and November 1906. Earth and space-based geodetic measurements indicate ongoing surface uplift above the Socorro magma body at approximately 2 mm/year.

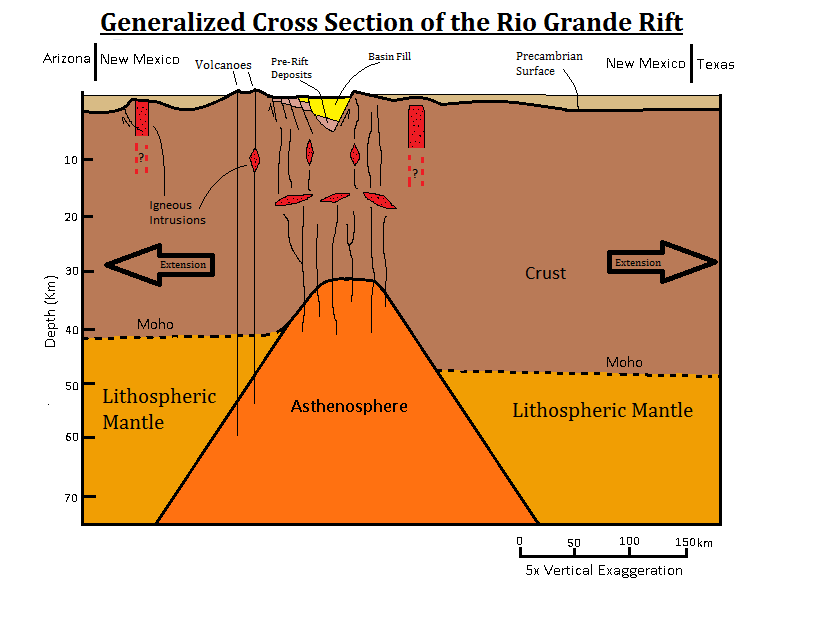
A generalized cross section of the Rio Grande Rift, showing lithospheric and asthenospheric structure. Note the magma lenses and volcanics caused by the welling up of the asthenosphere into the crust, and the thinning of the lithosphere

Deep seismic image of the Rio Grande rift compiled from the seismic transect shown in the previous figure, showing inferred mantle flow and imaged crust-mantle (Moho) topography (after Wilson et al.)(2005).\

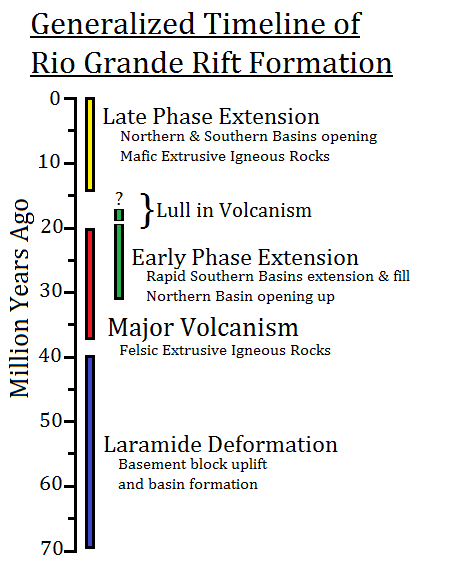
A brief timeline showing extension and volcanism in the Rio Grande rift area. The end of the Laramide orogeny was followed by volcanism and then extension. Changes in lava chemistry are also found, resulting from changes in magmatic sources.

== Geologic history ==
Seismic profile from the Rio Grande Rift Seismic Transect (RISTRA) experiment crossing the rift system, with Cenozoic extended terrain of the rift and southern Great Basin tectonic provinces indicated.

The Rio Grande rift's tectonic evolution is fairly complex. The fundamental change in the western margin of the North American plate from one of subduction to a transform boundary occurred during Cenozoic time. The Farallon plate continued to be subducted beneath western North America for at least 100 million years during Late Mesozoic and early Cenozoic time. Compressional and transpressional deformation incurred by the Laramide Orogeny lasted until about 40 Ma in New Mexico. This deformation may have been a result of the coupling between the subducting Farallon plate and the overlying North American Plate. Crustal thickening occurred due to Laramide compression. After the Laramide Orogeny and until 20 Ma, a major period of volcanic activity occurred throughout the southwestern United States. Injection of hot magmas weakened the lithosphere and allowed for later extension of the region.

Cenozoic extension started about 30 million years ago (Ma). There are two phases of extension observed: late Oligocene and middle Miocene. The first period of extension produced broad, shallow basins bounded by low-angle faults. The crust may have been extended as much as 50% during this episode. Widespread magmatism in mid-Cenozoic time suggests that the lithosphere was hot, the brittle-ductile transition was relatively shallow. There is evidence that the second period of extension began earlier in the central and northern Rio Grande rift than in the south. A third period of extension may have begun in the early Pliocene.

One theory is that the Colorado Plateau acts as a semi-independent microplate and one way of explaining the creation of the Rio Grande rift is by the simple rotation of the Colorado Plateau 1-1.5° in a clockwise direction relative to the North American craton. Other explanations that have been offered are that the extension is driven by mantle forces, such as large-scale mantle upwelling or small-scale mantle convection at the edge of the stable craton; collapse of over-thickened continental crust; initiation of transform faulting along the western margin of the North American plate; or detachment of a fragment of the Farallon plate beneath the Rio Grande region that enhanced asthenospheric upwelling in the slab window.

== See also ==
- Caja del Rio
- Geologic timeline of Western North America
- Lucero volcanic field
- Pajarito Plateau
- Potrillo volcanic field
- Rio Grande Trail
