= Golconda, Nevada =

- Census-designated place
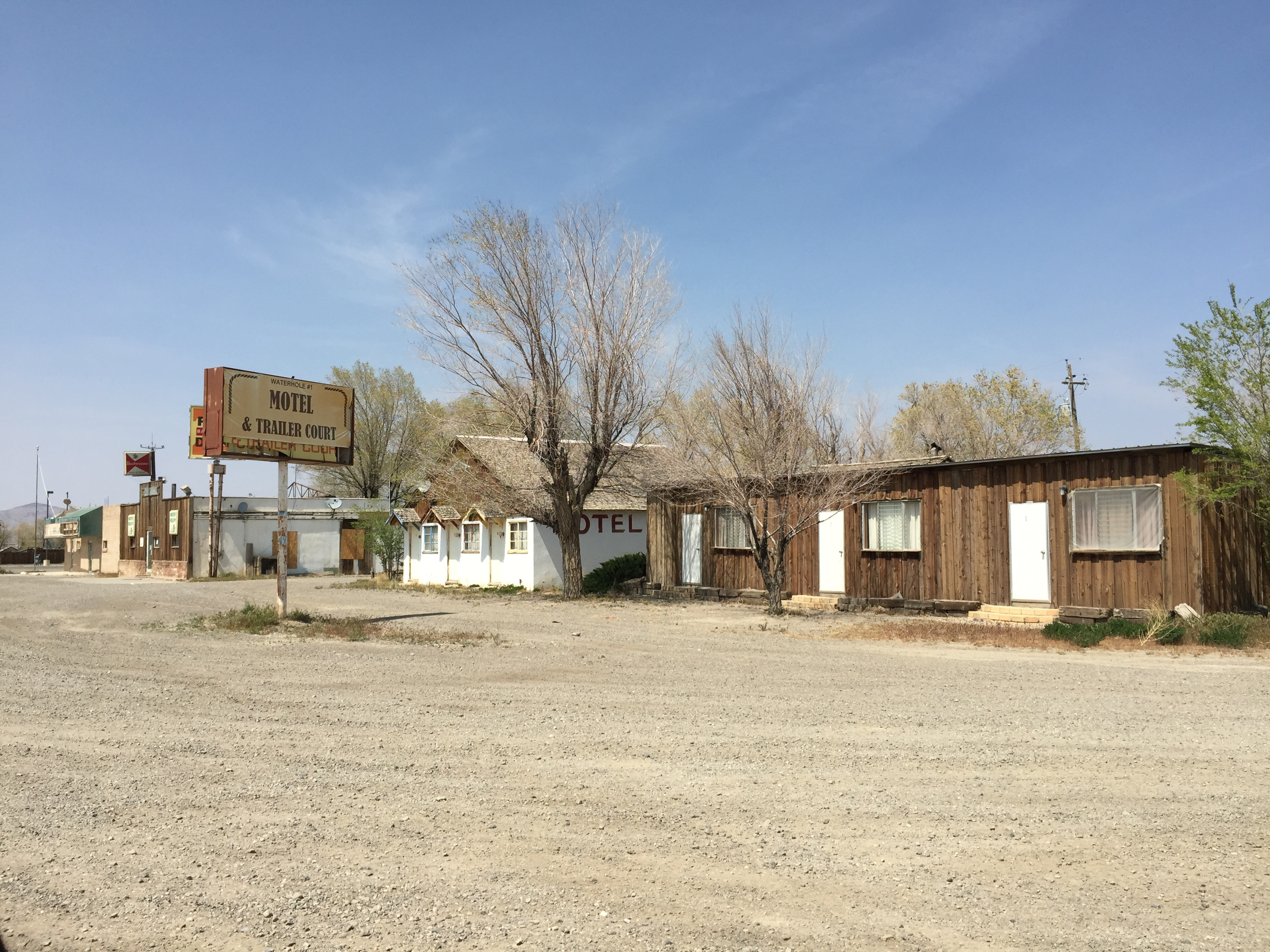

- Location within the state of Nevada Golconda (the United States)
- Coordinates: 40°57′12″N 117°29′21″W
- Country: United States
- State: Nevada
- County: Humboldt

Area
  - Total: 1.69 sq mi (4.39 km^{2})
  - Land: 1.69 sq mi (4.39 km^{2})
  - Water: 0 sq mi (0.00 km^{2})
- Elevation: 4,423 ft (1,348 m)

Population (2020)
  - Total: 182
  - Density: 107/sq mi (41.5/km^{2})
- Time zone: UTC-8 (Pacific (PST))
  - Summer (DST): UTC-7 (PDT)
- ZIP code: 89414
- Area code: 775
- FIPS code: 32-28500
- GNIS feature ID: 2583928

Nevada Historical Marker
- Reference no.: 105

Golconda is a census-designated place in southeastern Humboldt County, Nevada, United States. As of the 2020 census it has a population of 182. It is located along Interstate 80 on the Humboldt River in the northwestern part of the state. Golconda has a post office, which has been in operation since 1869.

== History ==
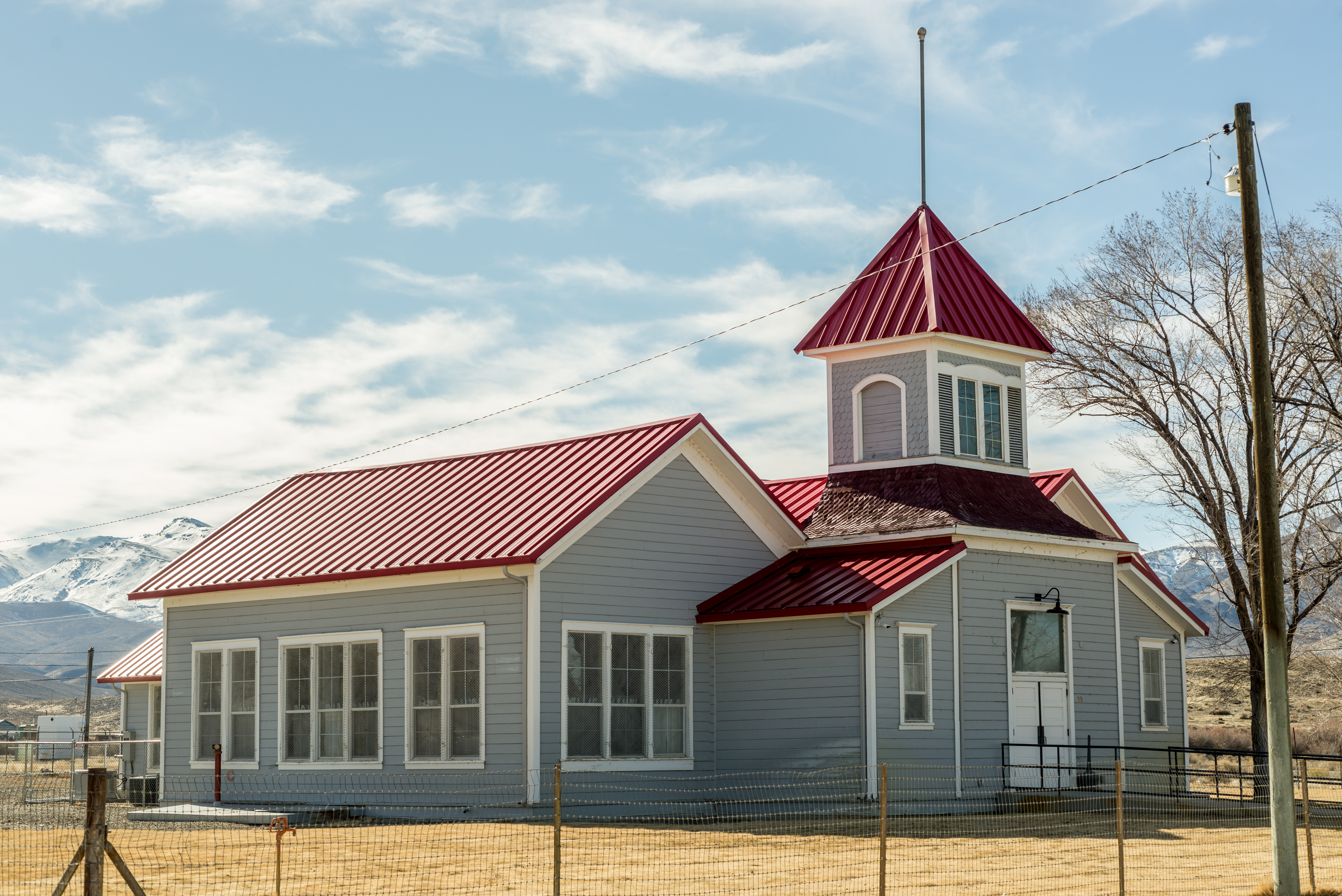
Golconda School is listed on the National Register of Historic Places

Golconda was founded in 1869. The community was named for the ancient diamond mining center of Golkonda in India. The settlement had its start when the discovery of copper, silver, gold, and lead brought entrepreneurs who opened mines and mills in the district. The town was a diverse society including both native-born European Americans as well as other groups including individuals of French, Portuguese, Paiute, and Chinese descent who all lived and worked in the small community. During 1898–1910, the town had a train depot, several hotels, a school, businesses, newspapers, and two brothels. Its population peaked at about six hundred in 1907–08. Although boosters predicted growth for Golconda, after 1910 the mines played out, leaving the region as an area of ranches and farms. Most of the town's buildings from its mining heyday are gone, and Golconda today is a minor stop on Interstate 80.

== Geography ==
The community lies at an elevation of approximately 4,350 feet (1,330 m) 12 mi (19 km) east of Winnemucca across the Sonoma Range and 5.7 mi (9.2 km) west of Golconda Summit, a nearby mountain pass on Edna Mountain. The Osgood Mountains lie across the Humboldt River to the north.

According to the United States Census Bureau, the Golconda CDP has an area of 9.0 square miles (23.4 km^{2}), all land.

== Demographics ==
Historical population
Census	Pop.	Note	%±
2020	182		—
U.S. Decennial Census

== See also ==
- Golconda Thrust
