= Smartville Block =

Volcanic arc accreted onto the North American Plate

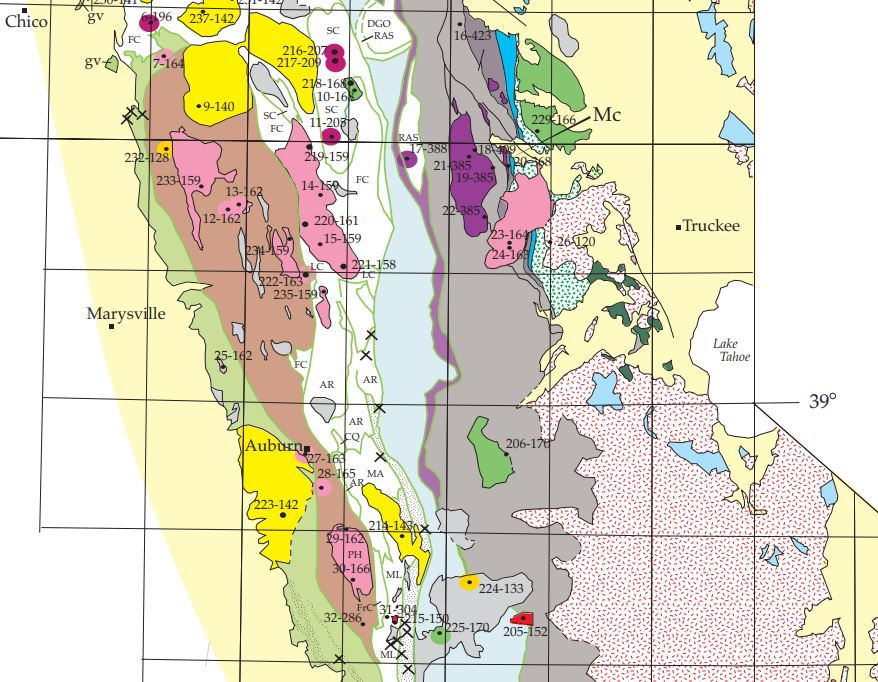
Geologic map depicting the Smartville Complex (in brown) and other accreted terranes in California.

The Smartville Block, also called the Smartville Ophiolite, Smartville Complex, or Smartville Intrusive Complex, is a geologic terrane formed in the ocean from a volcanic island arc that was accreted onto the North American Plate during the late Jurassic (~160–150 million years ago). The collision created sufficient crustal heating to drive mineral-laden water up through numerous fissures along the contact zone. When these cooled, among the precipitating minerals was gold. Associated with the Western Metamorphic Belt of the Sierra Nevada foothills it extends from the central Sierra Nevada mountain range, due west, under a section of the Central Valley and California Coast Ranges, in northern California. The ophiolitic sequence found in this terrane is one of several major ophiolites found in California. Ophiolites are crustal and upper-mantle rocks from the ocean floor that have been moved on land. Ophiolites have been studied extensively regarding the movement of crustal rocks by plate tectonics.

== Gold ==
Gold was discovered in California in the mid 1800s. The Smartville Block is named for the small Gold Rush town of Smartville in Yuba County, California. Gold found in the Smartville Block and within the metamorphic belts of the Sierra Nevada foothills were created through hydrothermal processes. Mineral rich groundwater is heated geothermally and injected towards the surface through fractures in the rock created from faulting. Gold and other minerals are precipitated from this fluid and have accumulated in the Sierra Nevadan metamorphic belt region in features called veins.

The Smartville Block's eastern margin is the Rescue Lineament-Bear Mountains fault zone, and generally defines the range of gold-bearing veins of the Mother Lode region, important in the history of the California Gold Rush.

== Geology ==
The Smartville Ophiolite is divided into sections based on lithology that describe the origin of the rocks it is made up of. In order of increasing depth: the top most unit is called the upper volcanic unit, then the lower volcanic unit, followed by the dike complex, and the plutonic suite at the bottom. The upper volcanic unit consists mainly of pillow lava and massive lavas with turbidites also being common. The turbidites of the upper volcanic unit are made of a siliceous rock type and have sandstones and conglomerate tops. Next is the lower volcanic unit, which is mostly pillow lava, breccia, and intrusive rocks. Metasediments of mostly mafic and intermediate tuffaceous composition are cut by dikes (intrusive rock). Below the lower volcanic unit is the dike complex. The dike complex has dacite and rhyolite dikes that cut into the rocks of the lower volcanic unit. At the base is the plutonic suite that are made up of gabbro, diorite, and other plutonic rocks that are intruded by dikes as well as granitic plutons from the Nevadan Orogeny.

== See also ==
- Geologic timeline of Western North America
- Sierra Nevada-Great Valley Block – Geologic feature in California, United States
- Rescue Lineament-Bear Mountains fault zone

== Additional Reading ==
- Assembling California, John McPhee, 1993. Farrar, Straus and Giroux, New York. ISBN 0-374-52393-2
- Day, Howard W., E. M. Moores, and A. C. Tuminas. "Structure and tectonics of the northern Sierra Nevada." Geological Society of America Bulletin 96.4 (1985): 436–50.
- Dilek, Yildirim. “Tectonic Significance of Post-Accretion Rifting of a Mesozoic Island-Arc Terrane in the Northern Sierra Nevada, California.” The Journal of Geology, vol. 97, no. 4, 1989, pp. 503–518.
- Dilek, Yildirim. "Structure and tectonics of an Early Mesozoic oceanic basement in the northern Sierra Nevada metamorphic belt, California: Evidence for transform faulting and ensimatic arc evolution." Tectonics 8.5 (1989): 999–1014.
- Menzies, Martin, Douglas Blanchard, and Costas Xenophontos. "Genesis of the Smartville arc-ophiolite, Sierra Nevada foothills, California." American Journal of Science 280 (1980): 329–44.
- Saleeby, Jason B. "Polygenetic ophiolite belt of the California Sierra Nevada: Geochronological and tectonostratigraphic development." Journal of Geophysical Research: Solid Earth 87.B3 (1982): 1803–24.
- Taylor, Ryan D. (2015). Orogenic gold formation and tectonic evolution of the Grass Valley gold district and temporal correlations of gold deposits in California. Diss. Colorado School of Mines. Arthur Lakes Library.
- Xenophontos, Costas, and Gerard C. Bond. "Petrology, sedimentation and paleogeography of the Smartville terrane (Jurassic)-bearing on the genesis of the Smartville ophiolite." (1978): 291–302.
