= Western North America =

Western part of the North American continent

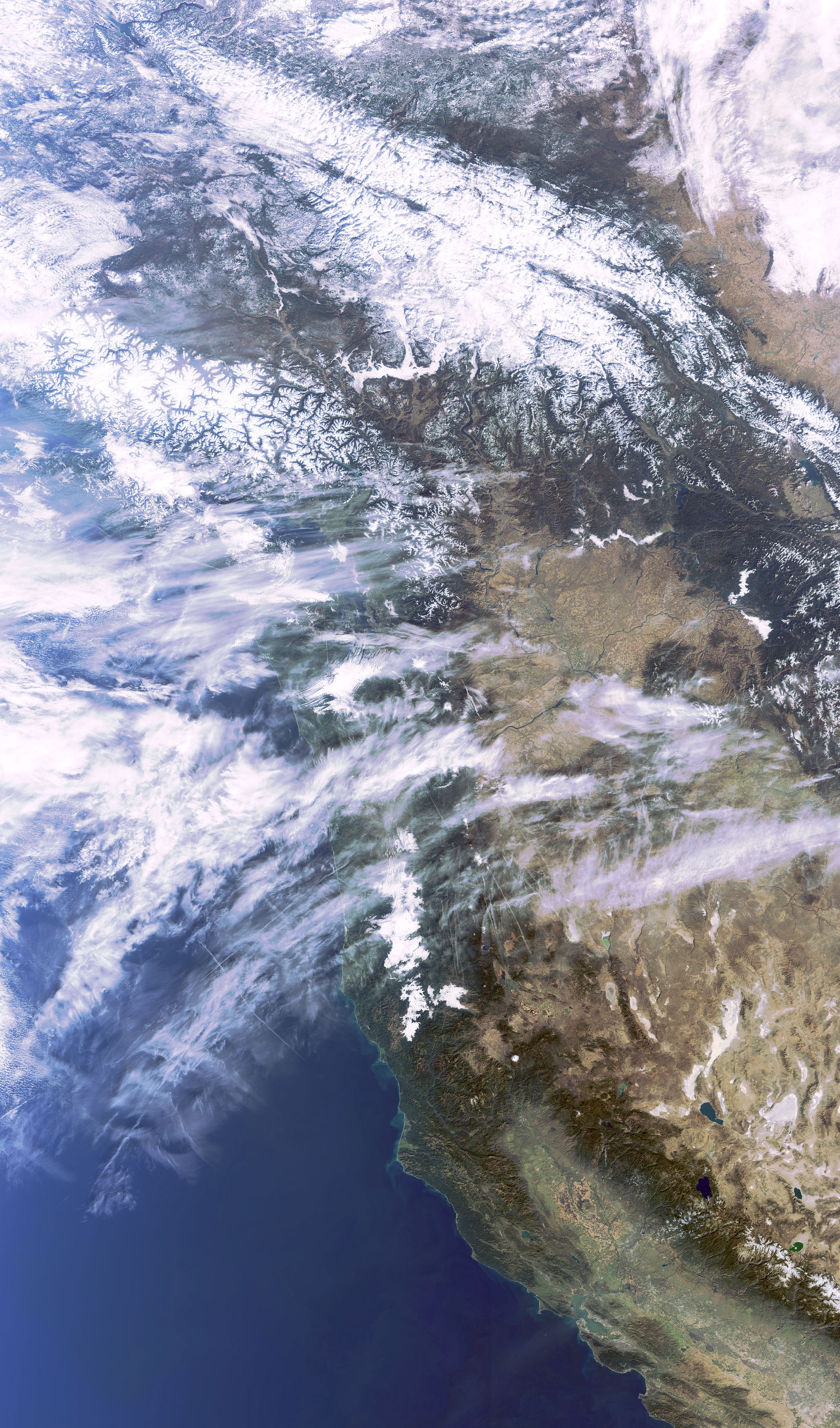
Satellite image of the United States portion of Western North America

Western North America is the western edge of the North American continent that borders the Pacific Ocean. It consists of Alaska at the farthest north, down through the western Canadian province of British Columbia, the western U.S. states of Washington, Oregon, and California, and then Mexico farthest south. The region consists of one long continuous mountain range formed over the last 350 million years through the movement of tectonic plates, as the large Pacific plate submerged under the North American plate through the process called subduction.

== See also ==
- Pacific Northwest
- Geologic timeline of Western North America
- History of the west coast of North America
- Western United States
- Western Canada
