= Nappe =

Geological structure

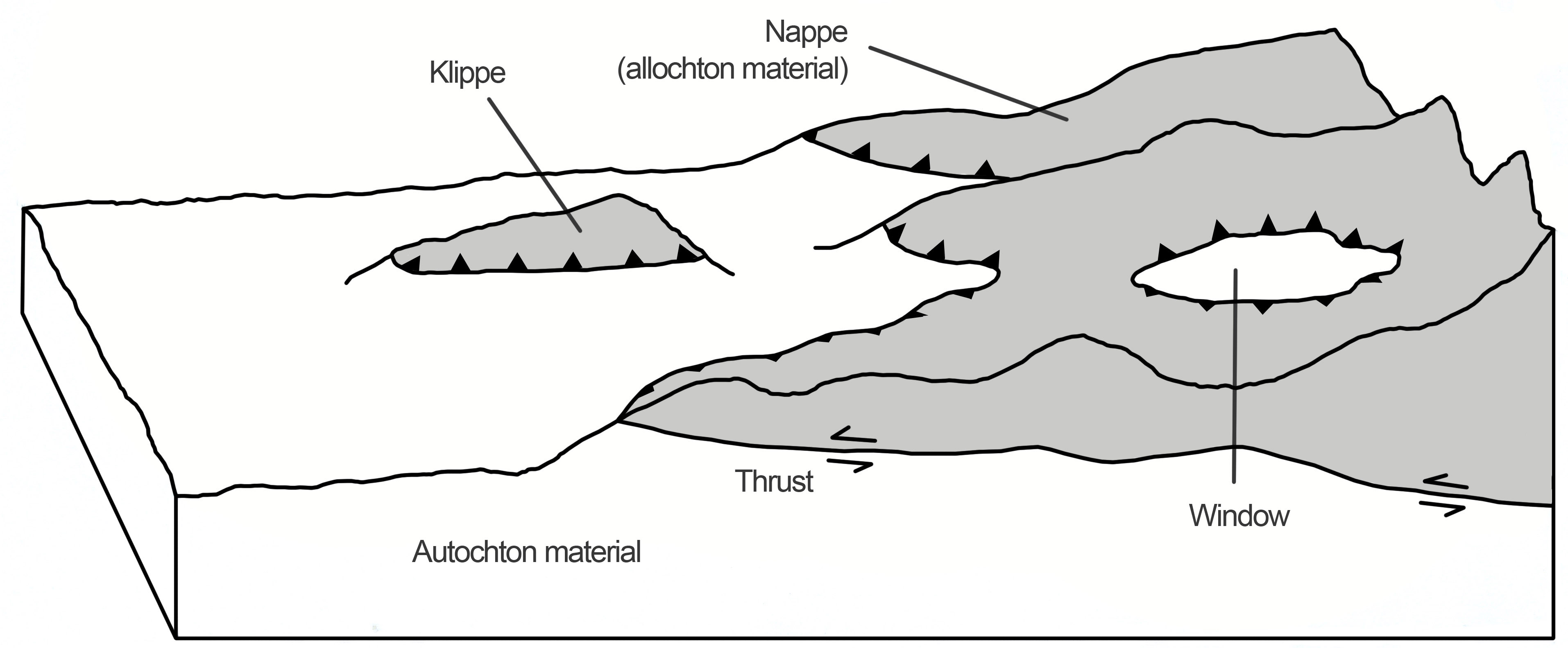
Schematic overview of an eroded thrust system. The shaded material is the nappe. The erosional hole is called a window or fenster. The klippe is the isolated block of the nappe overlying autochthonous material.

In geology, a nappe or thrust sheet is a large sheetlike body of rock that has been moved more than 2 km (1.2 mi) or 5 km (3.1 mi) above a thrust fault from its original position. Nappes form in compressional tectonic settings like continental collision zones or on the overriding plate in active subduction zones. Nappes form when a mass of rock is forced (or "thrust") over another rock mass, typically on a low angle fault plane. The resulting structure may include large-scale recumbent folds, shearing along the fault plane, imbricate thrust stacks, fensters and klippes.

The term stems from the French word for tablecloth in allusion to a rumpled tablecloth being pushed across a table.

== History ==
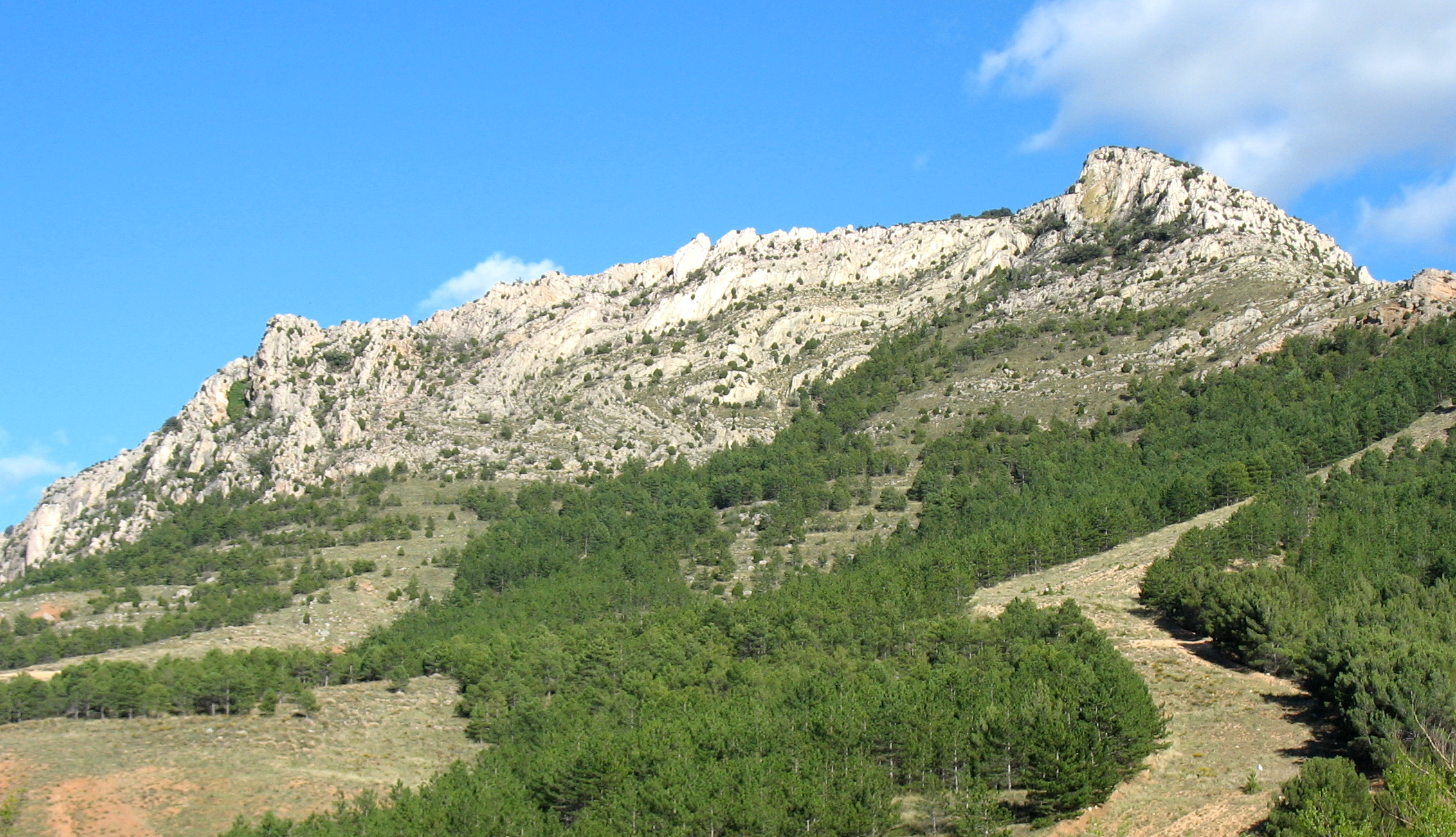
Recumbent fold: Teruel, Spain

Nappes or nappe belts are a major feature of the European Alps, Dinarides, Carpathians and Balkans. Since the 19th century many geologists have uncovered areas with large-scale overthrusts. Some of these were substantiated with paleontological evidence. The concept was developed by Marcel Alexandre Bertrand, who unraveled the complex tectonic history of the Alps and identified the feature as nappe de charriage. He reinterpreted earlier studies by Arnold Escher von der Linth and Albert Heim in the Glarus Alps. His work in Switzerland influenced Escher and Maurice Lugeon. Several years later, nappe structure was investigated in northwestern Scotland by Charles Lapworth. Lugeon later transferred the ideas of nappes to the Carpathians.

== Structure ==
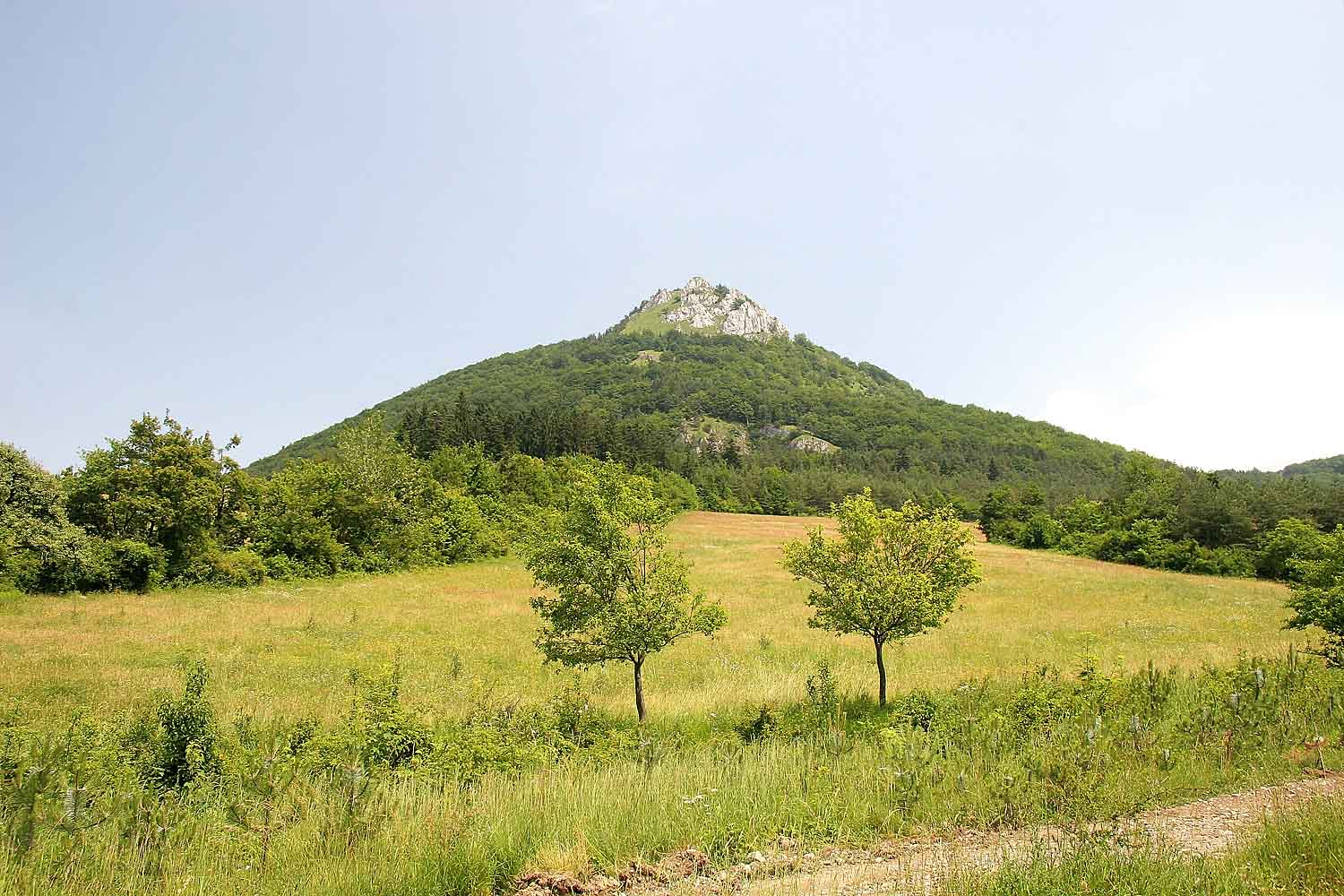
Klippe of Hronic nappe, Mt. Vápeč, Strážovské vrchy Mts., Slovakia

Nappe can be qualified in a number of ways to indicate various features of a formation. The frontal part in the direction of movement, is called the leading edge of a nappe; numerous folds and secondary thrusts and duplexes are common features here and are sometimes called digitations. The surface of a thrust fault which caused movement of a nappe is called a decollement, detachment plane or sole of thrust. The root area is an area where the nappe is completely separated from its substratum. It is often compressed and reduced, even underthrust below the surrounding tectonic units, resulting in a specific structure called a suture. A nappe whose root area is unknown, is called a rootless nappe.

Areas with a nappe structure often contain two types of geological features:

- A nappe outlier or klippe is a small area isolated from the main body of the nappe by erosion that lies on the autochthonous base; the summit of Veľký Rozsutec in the Western Carpathians is a typical example, or Chief Mountain in Glacier National Park, USA.
- A fault inlier, fenster, or window is an area of the autochthonous basement uncovered by erosion, but entirely surrounded by the body of the nappe; the Hohe Tauern window in the Alps is a typical example.

== Classification ==
According to petrographical composition, two basic types of nappes are known:

- Basement nappes are composed generally of crystalline basement rocks (but may contain basement sedimentary cover), forming so-called thick-skinned style. Nappes of this type usually reach a large thickness and form independent superunits such as Penninic nappes.
- Cover nappes or so called superficial nappes are composed generally of sedimentary rocks that form the upper part of crust, forming so-called thin-skinned style. Therefore, nappes of this type form smaller units, such as the Hallstatt nappe in the Austroalpine nappes of the Alps.

== Mechanisms of emplacement ==
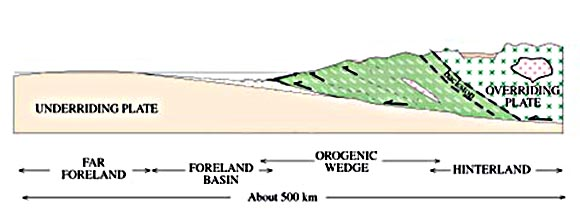
Converging tectonic plates and the orogenic wedge

Nappes are generally considered as compressional structures, however some exceptions could be found especially among the gravitational slides along low angle faults. Gravitational forces could even be important in certain cases during emplacement of compressional thrusts. The movement of huge masses of rock may be influenced by several forces, forces that may act together or sequentially. These forces frequently result in high temperature and pressure metamorphism and strong deformation of nappe rocks.

At shallower depths, low pressures and temperatures can't cause the plastic and viscous behavior of solid rock necessary to move along low angle faults. It is considered that such characteristics may be achieved at significantly less extreme conditions in the clayey rocks or evaporites, which can then act as tectonic lubricants. The process, which significantly reduces the frictional resistance, is the fluid overpressure, which acts against the normal pressure, thereby reducing high lithostatic pressures and allowing fracturation, cataclasis and formation of tectonic breccia or fault gouge that could act as a decollement plane. Evaporites are also often related the decollement and thrust planes. Evaporites are strongly prone to shear deformation and therefore preferred planes of detachment.

Behavior of thrust sheets is currently explained on the model of the orogenic wedge, which is dependent on the internal wedge taper θ. Gravitational sliding is movement generated by the movement down an inclined plane under the action of gravity. Gravitational spreading, possibly accompanied by an initial phase of diapirism, is generated by large heat flow that causes detachment in a hinterland. Other mechanisms, such as push from behind, action of tangential compressive forces, and shortening of the basement, are essentially variations of the previous mechanisms.
