= Golconda Thrust =

Major oceanic terrane that was thrust over central and northern Nevada, United States

The Golconda Thrust is a major oceanic terrane that was thrust over central and northern Nevada, North America, in possibly sometime between the late Permian and the late Jurassic. It is considered equivalent to the Tobin thrust fault.

It contains the Havallah sequence.

== Timing the Golconda Thrust ==
The time of the Golconda Thrust is not perfectly clear, and it may pre-date the Sonoma orogeny. Other references suspect it appears to have thrust during the Sonoma orogeny.

== See also ==
- Geology of Nevada
- Golconda, Nevada
- Sonomia terrane

== External links and references ==
- One link
- Another link
