= Window (geology) =

Eroded area in which a lower geologic unit crops out in the middle of higher units

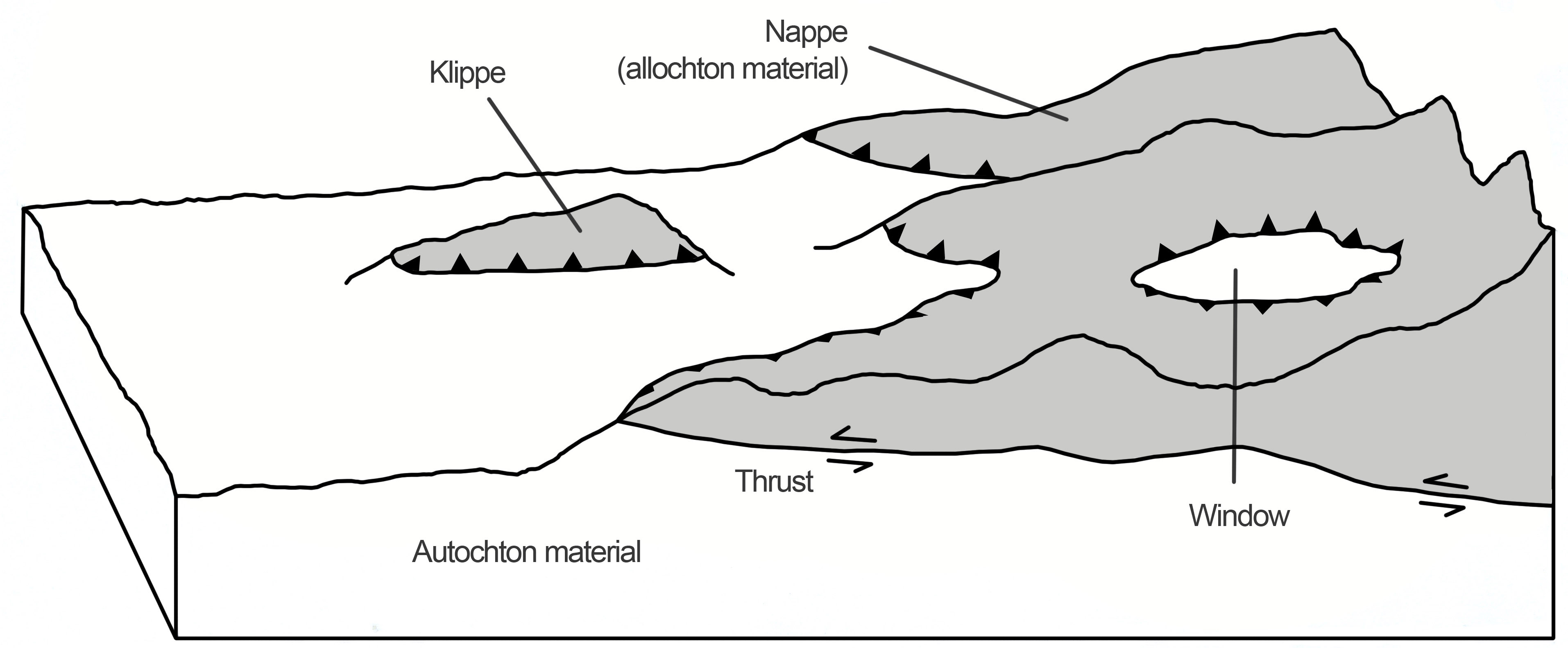
Schematic overview of a thrust system. The hanging wall block is (when it has reasonable proportions) called a nappe. If an erosional hole is created in the nappe that is called a window. A klippe is a solitary outcrop of the nappe in the middle of autochthonous material.

A tectonic window, or fenster (lit. "window" in German), is a geologic structure formed by erosion or normal faulting on a thrust system. In such a system the rock mass (hanging wall block) that has been transported by movement along the thrust is called a nappe. When erosion or normal faulting produces a hole in the nappe where the underlying autochthonous (i.e. un-transported) rocks crop out this is called a window. Klippen are also a feature near windows.

The klippe is the remnant portion of a nappe after erosion has removed connecting portions of the nappe. This process results in an outlier of exotic, often nearly horizontally translated strata overlying autochthonous strata.

Windows can be almost any size, from a couple of metres to hundreds of kilometres. Well known examples of tectonic windows are Hohe Tauern window in Eastern Alps or Hrzdavá dolina tectonic window in Western Carpathians.
