= Klippe =

Geological feature

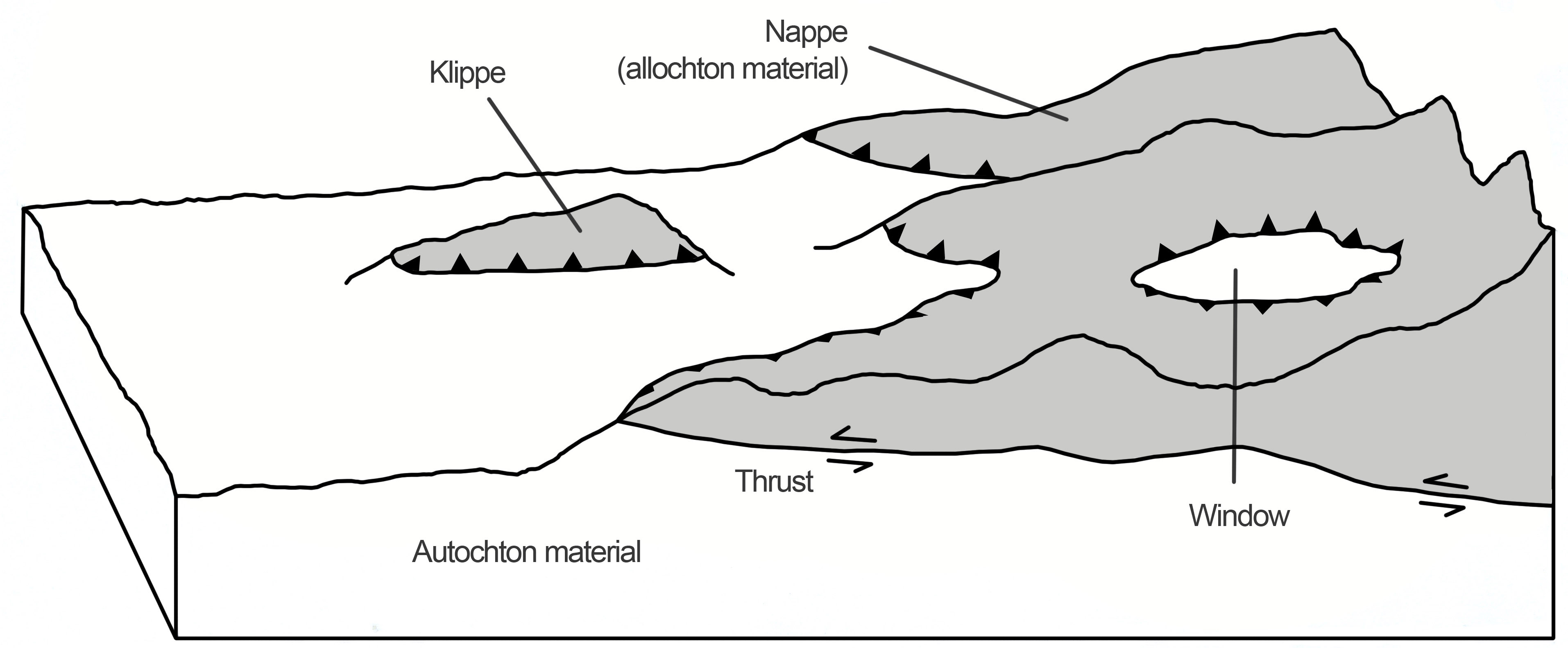
Schematic overview of a thrust system. The shaded material is called a nappe. The erosional hole is called a window or fenster. The klippe is the isolated block of the nappe overlying autochthonous material.

A klippe (German for cliff or crag; plural klippen or klippes) is a geological feature of thrust fault terrains. The klippe is the remnant portion of a nappe after erosion has removed connecting portions of the nappe. This process results in an outlier of exotic, often nearly horizontally translated strata overlying autochthonous strata.

== Examples ==
- Chief Mountain, Montana
- Mount Yamnuska, Alberta
- The Rock of Gibraltar
- Acropolis of Athens, Greece
- Bac Grillera, Catalonia, Spain. The nappe of which this klippe once formed part had its root in the northern part of the Pyrenees mountain range.

Klippes may also be found in the Pre-Alps of Switzerland and some of the isolated mountains in Assynt, Sutherland, in NW Scotland.

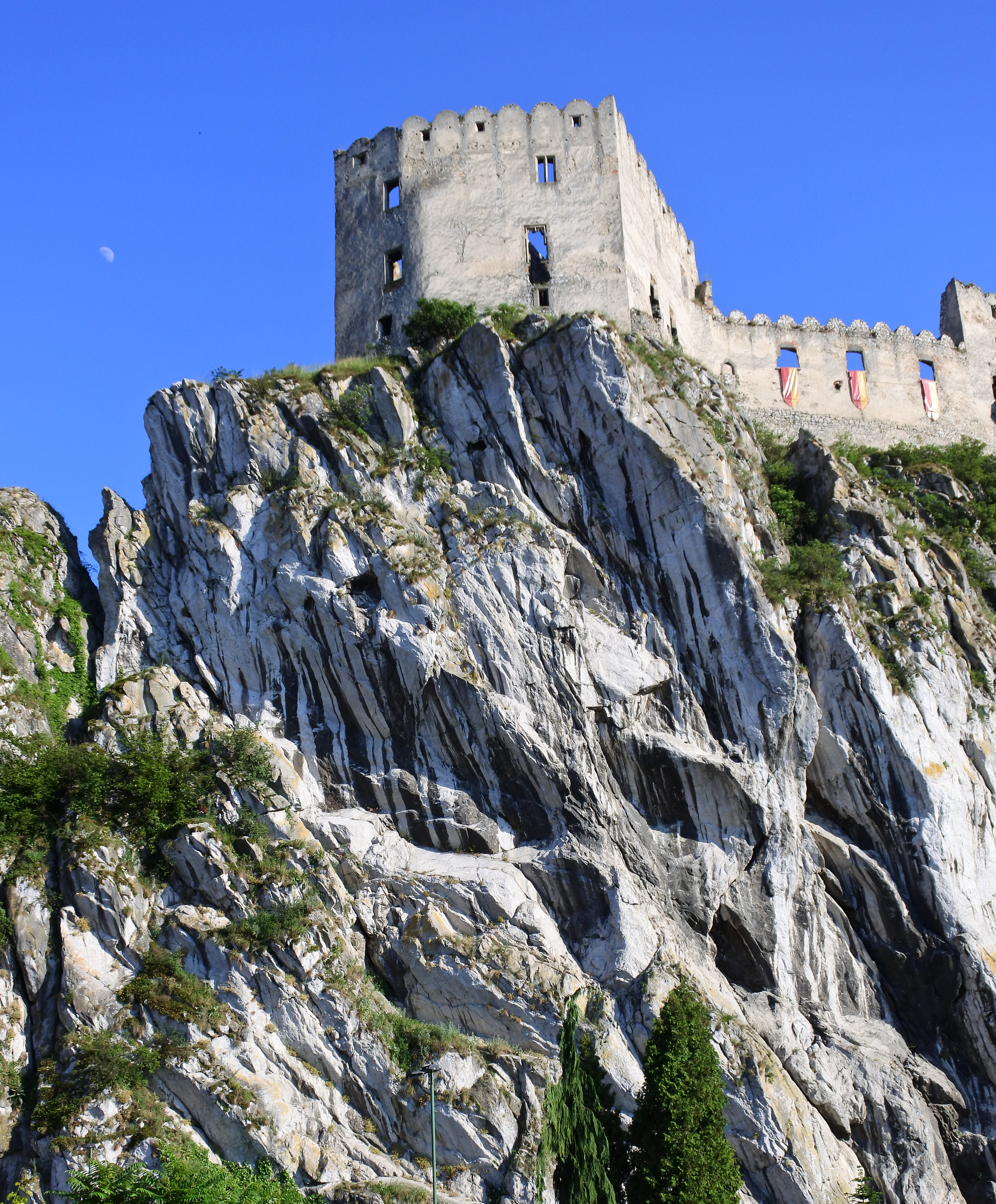
Beckov Castle, Slovakia, perched on a limestone klippe

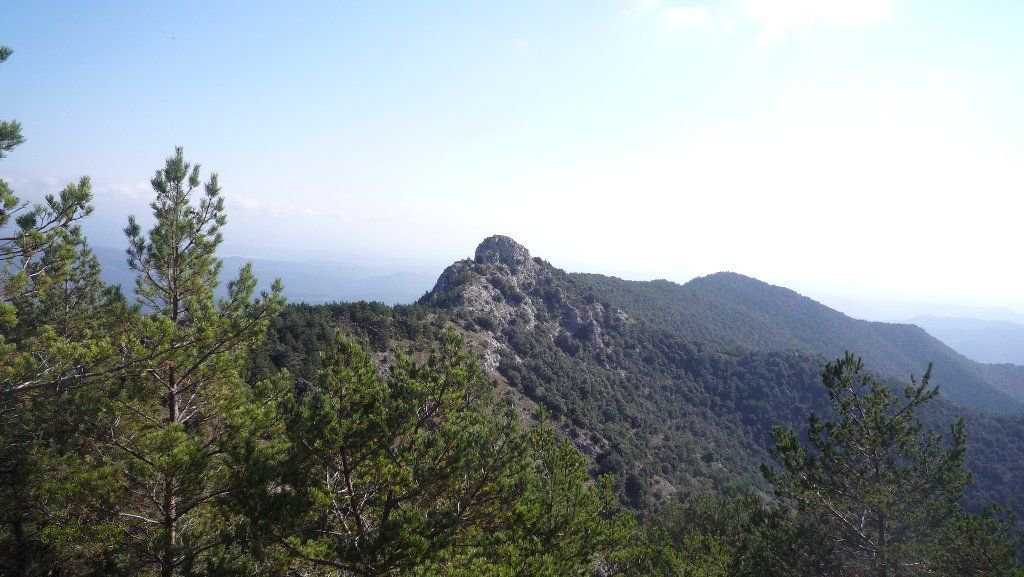
Serra de Bac Grillera, Catalonia, Spain (Lower Jurassic limestone resting on younger autochthonous Tertiary formations)
