= Mother lode =

Principal vein of gold or silver ore

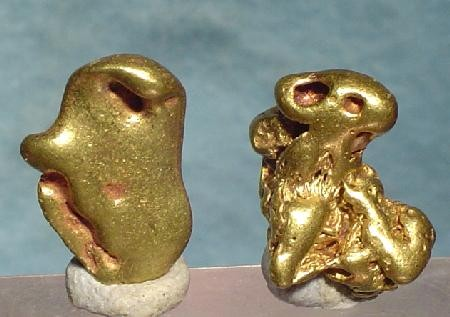
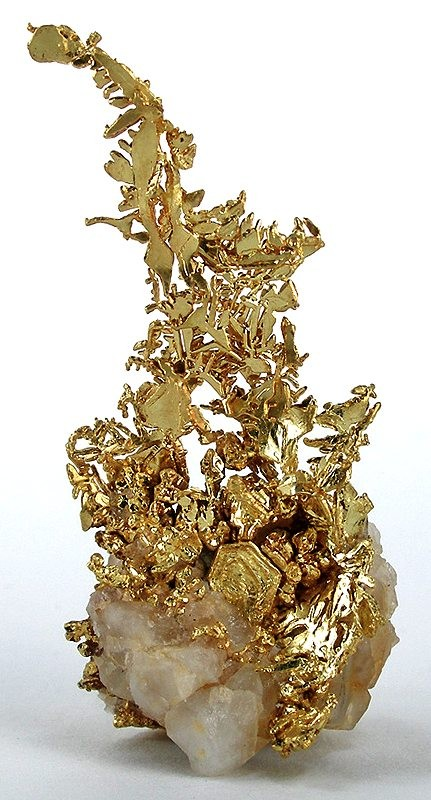
(Left) Two water-worn gold nuggets from Tuolumne County, California. They are typical of larger nuggets found by the early California gold rush placer miners (each ~1.6 x 1.1 x 0.3 cm). (Right) Crystalline gold specimen from the California Mother Lode, probably from Tuolumne County (5.3 x 2.7 x 2.4 cm).

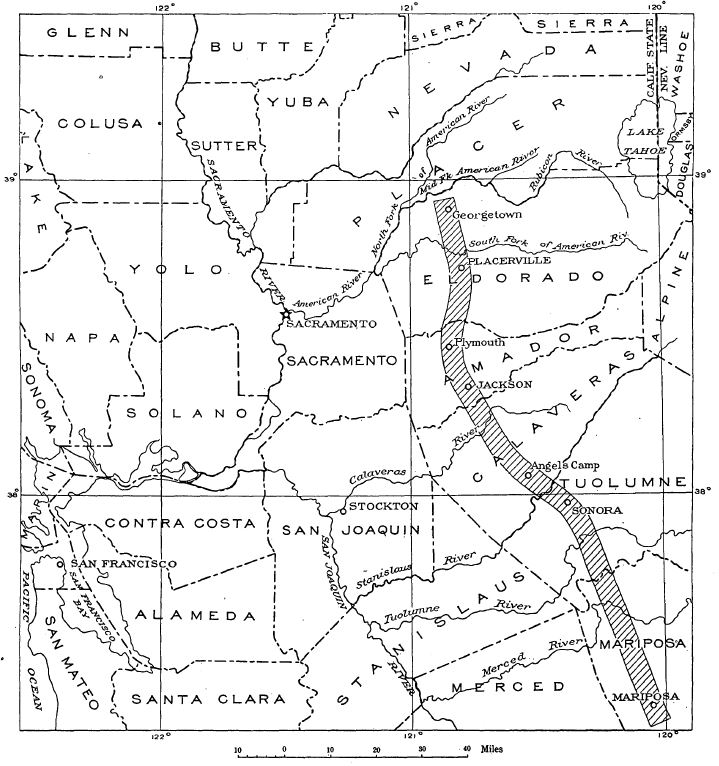
The Mother Lode belt in California

Mother lode is a principal vein or zone of gold or silver ore. In mining terminology, the "mother lode" refers to the bedrock source from which placer gold erodes into streambeds.

While the term has entered popular culture through films, video games, and other media, it probably derives from a literal translation of the Spanish veta madre, a phrase common in old Mexican mining. It is also used colloquially to refer to the real or imaginary origin of something valuable or in great abundance.

In the United States, the California Mother Lode is a 190-kilometre-long (120 mi), 1.5-to-6-kilometre-wide (0.93 to 3.73 mi) alignment of hard-rock gold deposits in the Sierra Nevada of California, bounded on the east by the Melones Fault Zone. The deposits formed along the suture where the Smartville Block, a Jurassic oceanic terrane, accreted onto North America; hydrothermal fluids emplaced gold-bearing quartz veins during the Early Cretaceous. Discovered in the early 1850s during the California gold rush, the zone stretches from Georgetown in the north to Mormon Bar in the south and contains hundreds of mines. The Mother Lode district produced more than 13 million troy ounces of gold through 1959, making it one of the most productive gold-producing districts in the country.

== Term ==
The term probably came from a literal translation of the Spanish veta madre, a term common in old Mexican mining. Veta madre, for instance, is the name given to an 11-kilometre-long (6.8 mi) silver vein discovered in 1548 in Guanajuato, New Spain (modern-day Mexico).

== California Mother Lode ==
In the United States, Mother Lode is most famously the name given to a long alignment of hard-rock gold deposits stretching northwest–southeast in the Sierra Nevada of California, bounded on the east by the Melones Fault Zone. It was discovered in the early 1850s, during the California gold rush. The California Mother Lode is a zone from 1.5 to 6 kilometres (0.93 to 3.73 mi) wide and 190 kilometres (120 mi) long, between Georgetown on the north and Mormon Bar on the south.

The Mother Lode coincides with the suture line of a terrane, the Smartville Block. The zone contains hundreds of mines and prospects, including some of the best-known historic mines of the gold-rush era. Individual gold deposits within the Mother Lode are gold-bearing quartz veins up to 15 metres (49 ft) thick and a few thousand feet long. The California Mother Lode was one of the most productive gold-producing districts in the United States. Now it is known as a destination for tourism and for its vineyards.

As with most gold rushes, the California rush started with the discovery of placer gold in sands and gravels of streambeds, where the gold had eroded from hard-rock vein deposits. Placer miners followed the gold-bearing sands upstream to discover the source in the bedrock. This source was the "mother" of the gold in the river and so was dubbed the "mother lode".

== Geology ==
The California Mother Lode lies along the Melones Fault Zone in the western Sierra Nevada foothills. This fault marks the boundary where the Smartville Block, a Jurassic-age oceanic island-arc terrane, accreted onto the North American Plate approximately 160–150 million years ago. The collision drove mineral-laden hydrothermal fluids through fissures along the contact zone. Gold-bearing veins were emplaced during the Early Cretaceous, approximately 127–108 million years ago, as the intrusion of the Sierra Nevada Batholith remobilized and concentrated gold from the oceanic terrane rocks.

Individual veins in the Mother Lode strike northwest and dip northeast. Knopf (1929) described them as large tabular masses of milky quartz, "characteristically ribboned," up to 15 metres (49 ft) thick and a few thousand feet long. The vein mineralogy is predominantly quartz with minor calcite, ankerite, pyrite, arsenopyrite, and small amounts of other sulfides. Host rocks vary: in the southern and central districts, veins cut serpentinite-hosted tectonic mélange, while in the northern districts they cut black slate of the Jurassic Mariposa Formation. Hydrothermal fluids precipitated quartz and mariposite at approximately 320 °C and carbonate minerals at approximately 400 °C.

Knopf noted that the Mother Lode is not a single continuous vein but rather a system of linked or en echelon veins extending along the Melones Fault Zone. By 1924, the Mother Lode had yielded approximately $240 million in mineral output. Ore bodies include both quartz veins and mineralized country rock adjacent to the veins.

== Mining ==
California produced more than 106 million troy ounces of gold between 1848 and 1965, of which the Mother Lode district contributed more than 13 million ounces through 1959. Three successive extraction methods dominated: placer mining from 1848 (panning and sluicing surface gravels), hydraulic mining from the 1850s (high-pressure water jets eroding gold-bearing gravel banks), and hard-rock lode mining from the 1860s onward (underground tunnels following quartz veins). Lode mining became the dominant source from the 1880s to 1918; dredge operations began in 1898 and continued through the 1960s. The Empire Mine in Grass Valley, the state's longest-operating gold mine (1850–1956), produced 5.8 million ounces from 367 miles of underground passages.

The term "mother lode" has been applied to principal ore deposits worldwide. The veta madre of Guanajuato, Mexico, a 25-kilometre-long (16 mi) epithermal silver vein system discovered in 1548, produced an estimated 37,000 metric tonnes of silver between 1701 and 2004. In Australia, the goldfields at Ballarat and Bendigo in Victoria yielded more than 22 million ounces of gold after their discovery in 1851, though their geology — gold in quartz saddle reefs within folded Ordovician sandstone — differs from the fault-hosted veins of the California Mother Lode. The Witwatersrand basin in South Africa, source of an estimated 40 percent of all gold ever mined, contains gold in Precambrian sedimentary conglomerate rather than hydrothermal veins. In the Klondike district of Yukon, Canada, more than 20 million ounces of placer gold have been recovered since 1896, but the bedrock source — the mother lode in its literal sense — has never been found.

== In popular culture ==
The term has entered popular culture in several contexts.

- Mother Lode (1982 film)
- A cheat code in The Sims which grants the player an additional 50,000 Simoleons (the in-game currency)
- A zone in World of Warcraft: Battle for Azeroth (styled as The MOTHERLODE!!)
- The Mega Man Legends video game series featured a legendary treasure known as the Mother Lode as its central plot device.
- Deep in the Motherlode (1978 song by Genesis).

== See also ==
- California Gold Rush
- California State Route 49
- Empire Mine State Historic Park
- Gold Country
- Placer mining
- Quartz mining
