= Geology of the Jura Massif =

Thrust belt

- Overlap belt
- Simplified geological map of the Jura massif.
- Location: France and Switzerland
- Age: 13.82 Ma (age of movement on thrust faults; the rocks of the massif are much older)
- Formed by: Detachment and folding of the sedimentary covers

Dimensions
  - Length: 360 km (220 mi)
  - Width: 65 km (40 mi)

The Jura Massif is a thrust belt that formed from the Miocene as part of Alpine orogeny following the thrusting of the external crystalline massifs onto the Jura basement. The massif was built through the detachment and then folding of the sedimentary covers of the Jura paleogeographic domain. These Mesozoic covers correspond mainly to limestone deposits from a shallow epicontinental sea separating the European foreland from the northern passive margin of the Alpine Tethys. They are overlain, particularly in the south, by the Cenozoic molasse of the North Alpine foreland basin, also known as the Swiss Molasse Basin.

Studied since the 18th century, the Jura Massif quickly became a model for the study of limestone massifs. However, it was thanks to numerous seismic surveys conducted during the 1970s and 1980s by oil companies that the internal structure of the Jura Massif was fully understood. The description of the folding of the limestone series and their significant erosion led to the development of the Jura relief model. Its extensive Jurassic sedimentary series is the reason for the name of this geological period, and several Lower Cretaceous stages were also defined in the Jura. Based on actualistic principles, the Jura Massif is considered a geological equivalent of the carbonate platforms of the Bahamas or Barbados.

== Geographic and geological framework ==
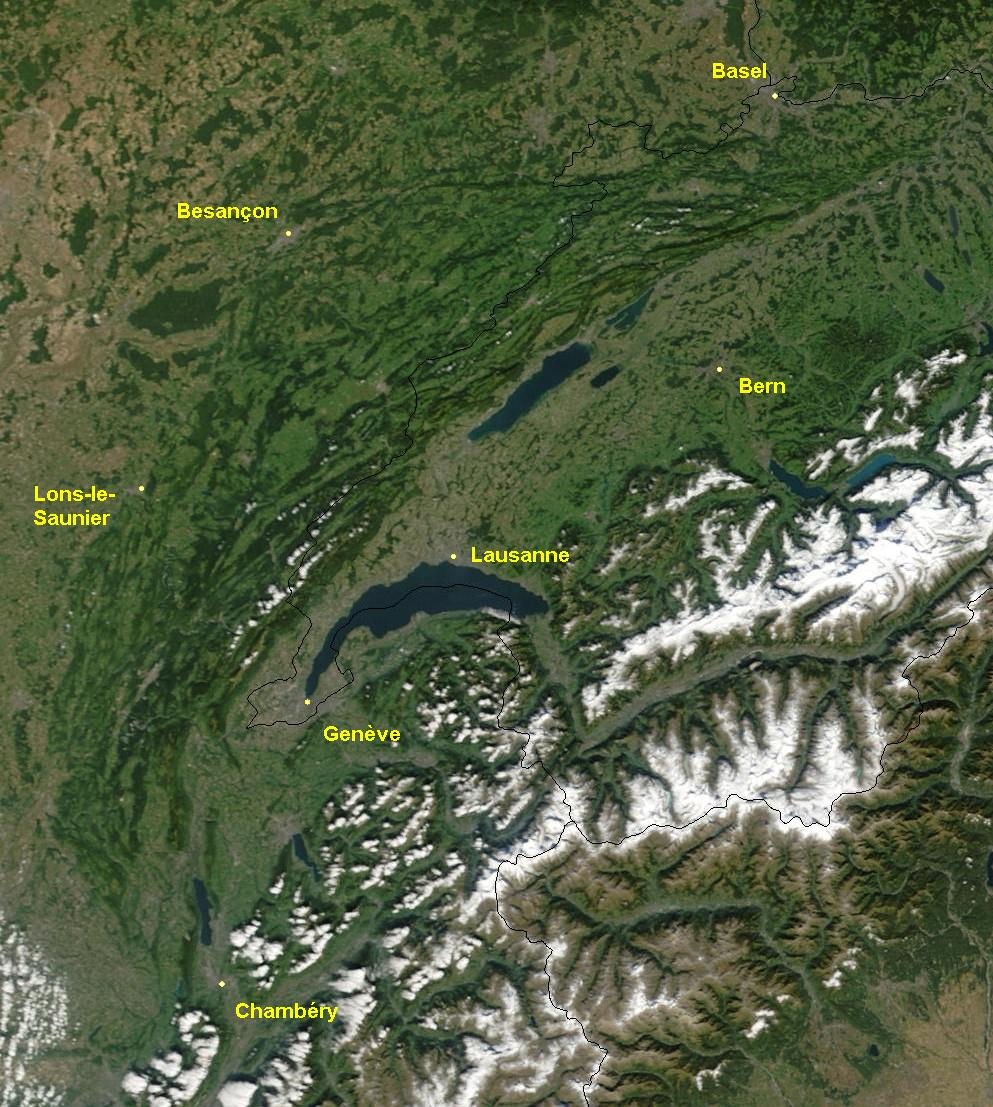
Satellite view of the Jura mountains.

The Jura Massif is an arched peripheral mountain chain of the Alps, located between the Western and Central Alps. It extends mainly along the Franco-Swiss border, forming an arc that shifts from a west-east axis in the north to a north-south axis in the south. Strictly speaking, the massif extends from the summit of Lägern (Zurich canton) in Switzerland to the Grand-Ratz/Dent de Moirans anticline plateau in the Isère department, France. The folds fade further south, and the massif disappears at the Isère Cluse, north of the Vercors Massif, giving way to the Subalpine massifs. The massif spans over 340 km in its inner arc and over 400 km in its outer arc, with a maximum width of 65 km between Besançon and Neuchâtel. Although geographically not part of the Jura Massif, the Salève, Mandallaz Mountain, and Âge Mountain ridges all belong to the same geological unit as the Jura.

The Jura Massif defines the outer boundary of the Alpine system. (Note: The Alpine system includes all geological units involved in the Alpine orogeny. These units are characterized by the detachment of sedimentary covers and, for the internal units, by metamorphism dating from the Cretaceous to the Paleogene.) Beyond this, to the northwest, the sedimentary covers are no longer detached from their basement, and the geological units are less affected by Alpine orogeny. First, there are faulted plateaus (Haute-Saône Plateau and Swabian Jura), which locally extend the external Jura units but do not participate in the curvature of the chain. The massif is also bounded by the Cenozoic West European Rift, which includes the Rhine Graben to the north and the Bresse Graben to the west. The shoulders of the Rhine Graben (the Vosges Massif to the west and the Black Forest to the east), as well as the Serre Massif, act as barriers against which the Jura Massif abuts. Finally, its inner boundary is marked by the Swiss Molasse Basin, or more broadly, the North Alpine foreland basin, which largely corresponds to the Swiss Plateau. This basin separates the Jura from the Prealps (Chablais Prealps and Romand Prealps) and the Subalpine massifs (Bornes, Bauges, and Vercors massifs). (Note: In geology, the Prealps include only reliefs composed of sedimentary covers belonging to the Penninic structural units (corresponding to the Valaisan, Briançonnais, and Piedmont paleogeographic domains), while reliefs formed by Delphino-Helvetic sedimentary covers are grouped into the Subalpine massifs.)

The relief of the Jura Massif resulted from the detachment of its sedimentary cover in the Miocene, forming detachment nappes that subsequently imbricated to create a thrust belt. The Jura paleogeographic domain corresponds to the proximal part of the European passive margin, characterized by shallow marine sedimentation with periodic emergence. Southeastward, it transitions into the Delphino-Helvetic domain, which represents an open marine environment with a higher proportion of pelagic intervals. During the Late Jurassic and Cretaceous, the Jura domain was regularly emergent, allowing the development of coastal continental environments, including swamps and beaches. This emergent threshold served as a corridor between the then-exposed Hercynian reliefs and reinforced the separation from the European foreland, which was dominated by shallow epicontinental sea deposits. The sedimentary covers of the Jura domain extend beyond the Jura Massif itself. Their presence in the Salève, Mandallaz Mountain, and Âge Mountain demonstrates that they continue beneath the North Alpine foreland basin (Note: The North Alpine foreland basin is actually a piggy-back basin, meaning it was passively transported on the Jurassic sedimentary covers.) and extend up to the thrust plane of the external crystalline massifs, meaning they also underlie the Subalpine massifs. Thus, the evolution of the Jura Massif and the North Alpine foreland basin are closely linked.

== History of geological studies on the Jura Massif ==
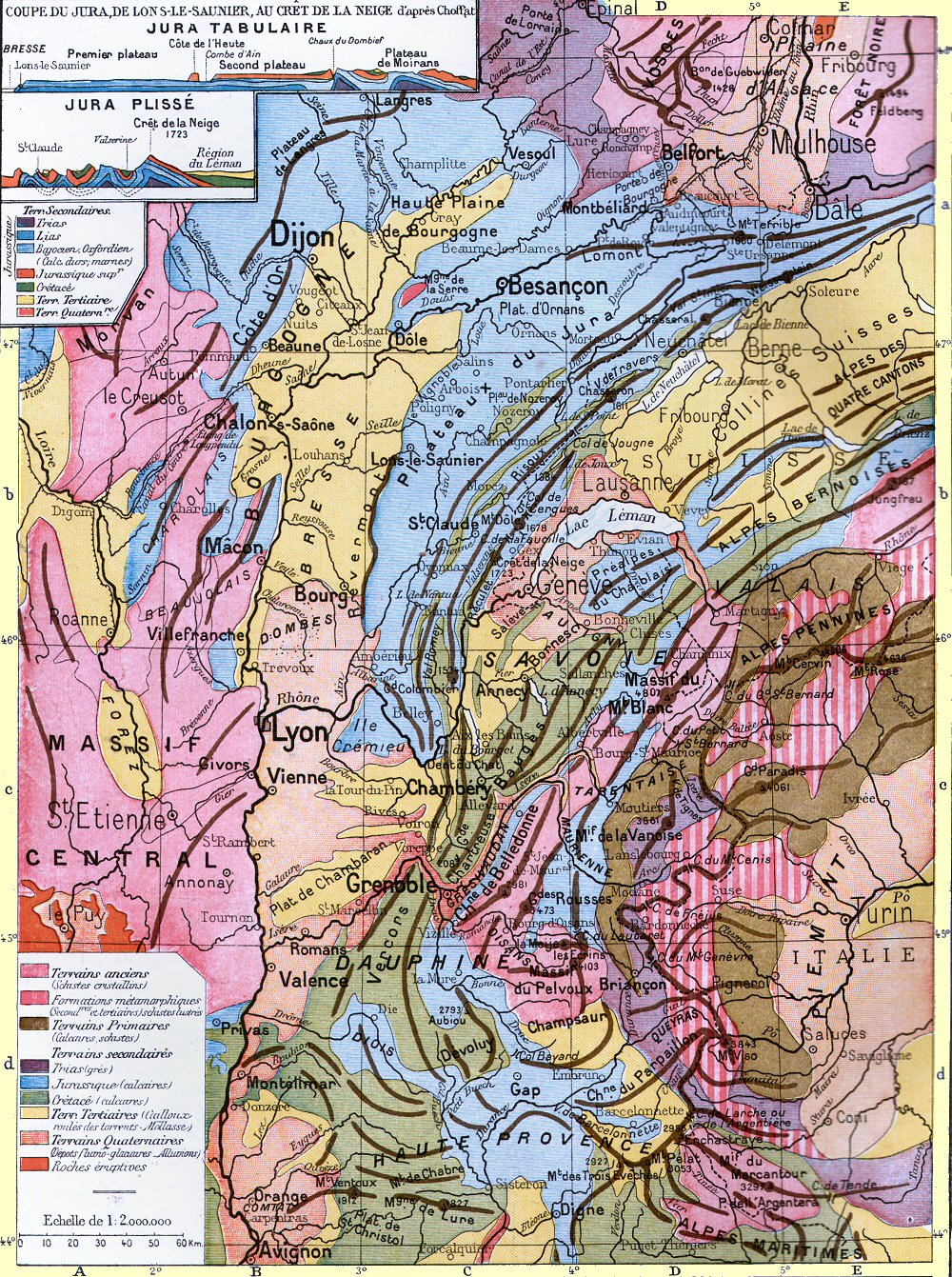
Geological map of the Jura massif from the end of the 19th century - beginning of the 20th century.

=== Early studies ===
The first geological studies of the Jura Massif began in the 18th and 19th centuries. However, it was in the early 19th century that the geology of the Jura Mountains truly captured the interest of structural geologists and paleontologists. As Jules Thurmann explains in the introduction to his Essay on the Jurassic Uplifts of Porrentruy (1832), early research introduced only vague notions that did not yet fully explain the massif’s geology. During the period covering the 18th century and the first quarter of the 19th century, the Jurassic terrains of the Jura Massif were poorly known and scarcely studied, in contrast to the Jurassic terrains of England, which served as a reference for studying this geological period.

=== The study by Jules Thurmann ===
The first major geological study of the Jura Massif was conducted by Swiss geologist Jules Thurmann, considered the father of Jura geology, during the second quarter of the 19th century. His four major publications on the subject are: Essai sur les soulèvements jurassiques, published in multiple volumes between 1832 and 1836; Esquisses orographiques de la chaîne du Jura, published in 1852; Résumé des lois orographiques générales du système des Monts-Jura, published in 1853; and Nouveaux principes d'orographie jurassique, published posthumously in 1857. (Note: Jules Thurmann died on July 25, 1855.) Unlike other geologists of his time, who attempted to apply the characteristics of English Jurassic formations to the continent, Thurmann relied on paleontology to identify the different rock layers of the massif.

=== Early tectonic explanations ===
Following Thurmann, many geologists attempted to explain the Jura’s tectonics. The massif was the subject of some of the earliest studies by Marcel Alexandre Bertrand in the 1880s, during which he created geological maps of the regions of Besançon, Lons-le-Saunier, and Pontarlier. The French geologist concluded that the Jura was the reference region for straight and regular folds. Following Bertrand’s work, the dominant tectonic model for the Jura between the late 19th century and mid-20th century described it as a simple, autochthonous fold chain formed in one or two phases, depending on the author. According to this model, the Jura’s formation resulted from tangential thrusting created by the "pushing mass" of the Alpine front from the southeast.

At the beginning of the 20th century, Louis Rollier, a professor at the University of Zurich, linked the formation of the Jura Massif to the presence of geosynclines formed at the start of the Cenozoic. He attributed the regularity and rounded shape of the folds (Note: According to the author, the Jurassic and Cretaceous sedimentary overload in the Jura should have formed powerful folds with ridge-like shapes morphologically comparable to those in the Alps.) to the presence of marginal Tertiary basins, which forced the massif to fold according to the "general contraction movement of the Earth's crust," preserving the contours of these basins. He also rejected the hypothesis that surrounding crystalline massifs (Vosges, Black Forest, and the Serre Massif) influenced the Jura’s folding. Instead, he argued that the collapse and sedimentary overload of the Tertiary basins, composed of heavy sediments, squeezed the Jura, forcing it to fold—effectively "sandwiched" between the Swiss basin to the east and the Bresse and Rhine basins to the west and north, respectively. According to Rollier, the deepening of certain folds resulted from a more pronounced folding of the crystalline basement compared to the sedimentary cover. In conclusion, Rollier refuted the hypothesis that the Jura’s formation was caused by Alpine thrusting, attributing it instead to the influence of the surrounding Tertiary basins.

=== The mid-20th century shift ===
The model of a simple, straight-folded chain was challenged by studies conducted in the second quarter of the 20th century, which showed that most Jura folds exhibit a complex structure that the prevailing formation model could not explain. Additionally, it became clear that the straight, regular folds—previously considered characteristic of Jura topography—were in the minority and primarily concentrated in the northern and western external Jura (regions of Delémont, Clerval, and the Revermont). In contrast, the folds of the High Jura Chain were of the "box fold" type, a point that Swiss geologists had emphasized for years.

In 1941, Maurice Lugeon proposed a new hypothesis regarding the formation of the Jura Massif, following several studies in the Alps in which he introduced the role of gravity to explain the emplacement and deformation of nappes. According to him, the sedimentary cover of the Jura detached from the Hercynian basement at the level of the Middle Triassic, as August Buxtorf had already pointed out. This shear plane was, moreover, shared with the molasse and the Helvetic nappes, implying that they underwent the same deformation history. However, Maurice Lugeon rejected the idea that the Jura had deformed as if compressed in a vise and instead invoked gravity as the sole explanation. Gravitational displacement implied the presence of a slope along which the Jura cover would have moved. These slopes corresponded to depressions located along the Alps (i.e., the present Swiss Molasse Basin) and between the Massif Central and the Vosges (i.e., the Bresse and Rhine grabens), which he defined as "subsurface folds." According to his hypothesis, the Jura was thus positioned on a counter-slope of the Hercynian peneplain, sliding along the plastic Triassic layers. However, since the consequences of such a movement appeared paradoxical, Maurice Lugeon abandoned this first hypothesis and formulated a new one based on the transmission of compressional forces. According to this second hypothesis, the Mesozoic layers were folded to the northwest of the Swiss Molasse Basin, where the molasse thinned, thereby weakening the system. The force driving this process was attributed to the weight of the Prealpine nappes, located at the southeastern edge of the Molasse Basin, which would have pushed the molasse and the Mesozoic layers toward the northwest, causing a basal detachment at the level of the Triassic layers.

In the 1940s, Louis Glangeaud, dean of the Faculty of Sciences in Besançon, based his analysis of the Jura structure on faults. He introduced new concepts, including "fault folds" and "pinched structures," (Note: Most locations corresponding to either of these two structural types analyzed by Glaugeaud are now incorporated into the structural family of the "faisceaux".) whose formation would be due to a phase of dislocation followed by a phase of folding. Extrapolating his analyses to the massif, Glangeaud showed that most of the major Jura fault structures date back to the Oligocene and are therefore older than the main Jura folding phase, which is dated to the Miocene. Furthermore, an overview of the geological map shows that the Jura fault network extends northward through the Haute-Saône plateaus. According to this analysis, the formation of the Jura Massif would therefore be subdivided into two phases: a first phase of dislocation in the Oligocene, dominated by vertical movements that formed a fault network affecting both the massif and the crystalline basement, and a second phase of folding in the Miocene and early Pliocene, where the formation of folds was guided by the Oligocene fault network. Glangeaud also noted that Lugeon’s hypothesis could not be applied to the external Jura but considered it applicable, with some reservations, to the High Jura Chain.

The debate on the formation of the Jura Massif revolved around two competing hypotheses:

- Folding occurred due to a basal detachment at the level of the Triassic rocks in the sedimentary cover, excluding any folding of the Paleozoic basement.
- The Paleozoic basement itself was folded due to compressive forces originating from the Alps.

=== Seismic surveys ===
Between 1970 and 1988, several oil exploration campaigns using seismic surveys were conducted by various companies in France and Switzerland. These included BP (Sector A, Neuchâtel Canton), Shell (Sectors B and C, Vaud Canton and northeast Vaud on the French border), Société Anonyme des Hydrocarbures (Sector B), and Shellrex (Sector D, Jura Department).

Seismic data (including seismic profiles and well data) were mostly retained by the companies and later made public during the 1990s. They were subsequently processed in two separate projects during the second half of the decade. The first project, conducted by the University of Neuchâtel, analyzed approximately 1,500 km of seismic lines covering the central Jura and the western part of the Swiss Molasse Basin. The second project was supervised by the University of Lausanne (Urs Eichenberger) and the Swiss Geophysics Commission (François Marillier). Nearly 4,500 km of seismic lines and thirty well data points were used to reconstruct the Swiss Molasse Basin from Lake Geneva to Lake Constance. Deep structures were constrained through the identification of eight seismic horizons: near the base of the Cenozoic, at the contact between the Upper Jurassic and Lower Cretaceous, within the Lower Jurassic, near the top of the Middle Jurassic, the Lower Jurassic, the Upper Triassic, the Middle Triassic, and near the base of the Mesozoic sequence. An additional horizon at the top of the Aalenian was also identified in the Jura. However, seismic reflectors within the Cenozoic layers are generally absent or discontinuous due to the homogeneity of the layers.

These results made it possible to highlight the duplication of the Mesozoic sedimentary cover in the Folded Jura (Note: Although this hypothesis had previously been suggested, the lack of borehole data or tunnel constructions in the Haute-Chaîne prevented it from being confirmed or constrained in geological cross-sections.) and the thickening of Triassic evaporitic layers (salt pillows, salt tectonics), which are responsible for the anticlines in the molasse of the plateau. The northeast-southwest orientation of these salt pillows, parallel to the axial traces of the folds in the Folded Jura, also demonstrated the involvement of evaporitic layers in the deformation of the Jura. Overall, seismic data corroborated the "distant push" model for the formation of the Jura. These data were later synthesized in the GeoMol project, aimed at constructing a 3D model of the Swiss Molasse Basin.

== Structural subdivisions ==
The difference in tectonic deformation styles observed throughout the Jura allows for the distinction between an "External Jura," which is weakly deformed, and an "Internal Jura," which concentrates most of the deformation and thus the shortening affecting the Jura domain. The deformation affects only the sedimentary covers, which have detached from the basement, while the latter remains largely unaffected. This difference is explained by the presence of a thick evaporitic layer from the Middle to Upper Triassic, which acts as a décollement level. Its thickness is estimated to range from 200 m in the northwest periphery to 1,000 m in the central part due to the imbrication of units. The decrease in the ratio of ductile layers (evaporites, marls) to competent layers (limestones) and an increase in the thickness of Mesozoic layers from northeast to southwest favor the development of décollement folds in the northeast and the imbrication of thrust faults in the southwest. The thickness of evaporitic layers also varies within each unit, especially between synclines (thinner) and anticlines (thicker). This thickness variation is particularly important when constructing balanced geological cross-sections, where it has not always been considered. Meanwhile, the basement dips 1 to 3° toward the southeast due to the lithostatic load exerted by the orogenic prism on the European plate.

The Jura is also traversed by a set of strike-slip faults that cut through the Jura's structural units indiscriminately. These faults have a north-south orientation in the eastern part, gradually shifting to a WNW-ESE orientation in the western Jura. They do not root into the pre-Triassic basement and affect only the sedimentary cover. They result from chain-parallel stretching and its arcuate morphology. Among the major faults, the Pontarlier and Vuache faults are notable.

=== External Jura ===
The external edge of the Jura is characterized by weak deformation of the sedimentary covers, which retain a sub-horizontal stratification. This weak deformation is partly explained by the lower thickness of the Triassic layers compared to the Internal Jura. It includes plateaus, separated by folded and faulted zones known as faisceaux.

==== Plateaus ====
The plateaus form a generally horizontal structure, with low-amplitude, long-wavelength décollement folds. Their weak deformation results from the thin sedimentary cover due to a long erosion phase between the Late Cretaceous and the Miocene. They thus form local undulations that do not exceed 100 m (Note: Bichet & Campy 2009, p. 162) and exhibit very little shortening, less than 5 kilometers. In some areas, the plateaus are incised by reculées, valleys carved by rivers. (Note: Bichet & Campy 2009, p. 169) The Jura plateaus have low-relief landscapes with a monotonous appearance. The nearly tabular disposition of the sedimentary layers favors the preferential erosion of younger layers, so that the Cretaceous is absent, leaving Jurassic layers exposed. Two plateau units are distinguished: the Lons-le-Saunier and Saône-Bouclans plateaus, with an average altitude of 500 to 550 m, while the Champagnole, Levier-Nozeroy, Ornans, and Amancey plateaus reach an average altitude of 650 to 750 m.

The "Tabular Jura" corresponds to the marginal plateaus with Jurassic terrains located between the Vosges and the Black Forest in the north and the northern part of the Jura massif in the south (Porrentruy and Belfort regions). It differs from the plateau Jura by the absence of sedimentary cover décollement and notable deformations. The layers exhibit sub-horizontal stratification and are cut by a network of north-south or northeast-southwest oriented faults formed during the Oligocene. The Tabular Jura represents the transition toward the Paris Basin. Haute-Saône plateaus to the west and the Isle-Crémieu plateau, on the western edge of the Ambérieu thrust zone, can be considered part of the Tabular Jura.

==== Faisceaux ====
The faisceaux are narrow, elongated deformation zones (up to 100 km long and a maximum of 10 km wide) that separate the plateaus and also form the western boundary of the Jura Massif. They are distinguished from the plateaus, which have a tabular morphology, by significant deformation caused by thrusting and folding of the sedimentary cover. (Note: Foucault & Raoult 2010, pp. 135–136) The external faisceaux thrust over the peripheral basins, such as the Bresse graben. In the landscape, they appear as elevated reliefs that contrast with the plateaus. Their varied topography results from differential erosion of exposed units, the presence of faults, and the tilting of layers. (Note: Bichet & Campy 2009, pp. 190–191) Three groups of faisceaux are distinguished: the western margin faisceaux (five faisceaux), which connect to form a continuous chain; the internal faisceaux (three faisceaux), which separate the plateaus; and the Avant-Monts faisceau, external to the chain and located northwest of the Besançon faisceau.

=== Internal Jura or Haute-Chaîne ===
The Internal Jura, also known as the "Haute-Chaîne," "Folded Jura," or "Helvetic Thrust Belt," forms the backbone of the massif and represents the current northern boundary of the Swiss Molasse Basin. The development of high-amplitude, northwest-oriented fault-propagation folds allows for significant imbrication of the sedimentary cover. These folds, associated with northwest- or southeast-verging thrust faults (back-thrusts), have displacements exceeding one kilometer. As a result, sedimentary cover duplication leads to significant thickening of the chain, accommodating a large portion of the shortening (up to 20 km). The fold amplitude depends on the thickness of the deformed sedimentary cover (ranging from 800 to 2,000 m) and the shortening rate. It reaches its maximum in the Central Jura and decreases laterally, either by the plunging of fold axial traces or by their truncation due to strike-slip fault planes. The attenuated structures of the Haute-Chaîne extend to the northern tip of the Vercors Massif (Dent de Moirans) via the western reliefs of the Chartreuse Massif (Épine Range and Grand-Ratz Plateau) and south of the Swabian Jura.

The layers located in a more internal position, beneath the Swiss Molasse Basin, exhibit very little deformation (a few detachment folds with amplitudes below 500 m and multi-kilometer wavelengths), except for the Salève Ridge, the Mandallaz Mountain, and the Âge Mountain, which accommodate 5 to 6 km of shortening. The lithostatic load exerted by the Cenozoic layers of the Swiss Molasse Basin, which reach up to 5 km in thickness in the southern portion, prevents any deformation of the underlying Mesozoic layers. According to the "distant push" mechanism, stress is transmitted toward the more external units, which lack excessive molasse thickness (i.e., the Jura).

== Stratigraphic series ==
The stratigraphic series of the Jura Massif consists of a Proterozoic to Paleozoic basement unconformably overlain by a Mesozoic to Cenozoic cover. The thickness of the sedimentary cover ranges from 3 to 4 km in the southwest and decreases to 800 m toward the northeast. The Mesozoic cover corresponds to a carbonate platform that begins with continental to coastal Triassic deposits dominated by evaporites and dolomites. The Jurassic is characterized by the development of shallow-water limestones, including coral reefs. The Cretaceous is more variable, with an emergence phase between the Late Jurassic and Early Cretaceous marked by beach and marsh deposits, followed by marine transgression leading to shallow-marine deposits, including hydraulic dunes and tempestites in a carbonate ramp setting. This ramp deepened into the Early Late Cretaceous, allowing for the development of pelagic limestones. The Late Cretaceous is relatively absent in the Jura due to a prolonged erosion phase that continued until the Eocene, when siderolithic sandstones were deposited. Finally, the stratigraphic series ends with shallow-marine to continental detrital sedimentary deposits of the molasse from the Oligocene to the Miocene.

=== Paleozoic basement ===
From a stratigraphic perspective, the Jura basement includes all rock units involved in previous orogenies, dating from the Proterozoic to the Paleozoic. Due to the basement's minimal deformation, these rocks do not outcrop within the Jura Massif but form adjacent massifs such as the Serre Massif, the Vosges, the Black Forest, and, to some extent, the External Crystalline Massifs, though the latter belong to the Helvetic domain. The Moho is estimated to lie at a depth of 26 km, while the continental crust thickness increases southeastward from Lausanne, reaching 35 km due to the imbrication of the External Crystalline Massifs. Four major lithological groups can be identified in the basement:

- Polymetamorphic rocks, also described as Altkristallin. These ancient rocks, dating back to the Proterozoic, have undergone multiple phases of metamorphism and deformation, corresponding to several orogenic cycles. Their protoliths include both sedimentary and magmatic rocks.
- Rocks metamorphosed during the Variscan orogeny. These rocks formed during the previous orogenic cycle and were affected by only one phase of metamorphism and deformation.
- Permian intrusive igneous rocks that were not subjected to metamorphism.
- Permo-Carboniferous sedimentary rocks deposited in coal basins and grabens that developed during the late-orogenic relaxation phase. These sediments, of fluvial origin and derived from the erosion of the Hercynian chain, are rich in organic material and plant debris.

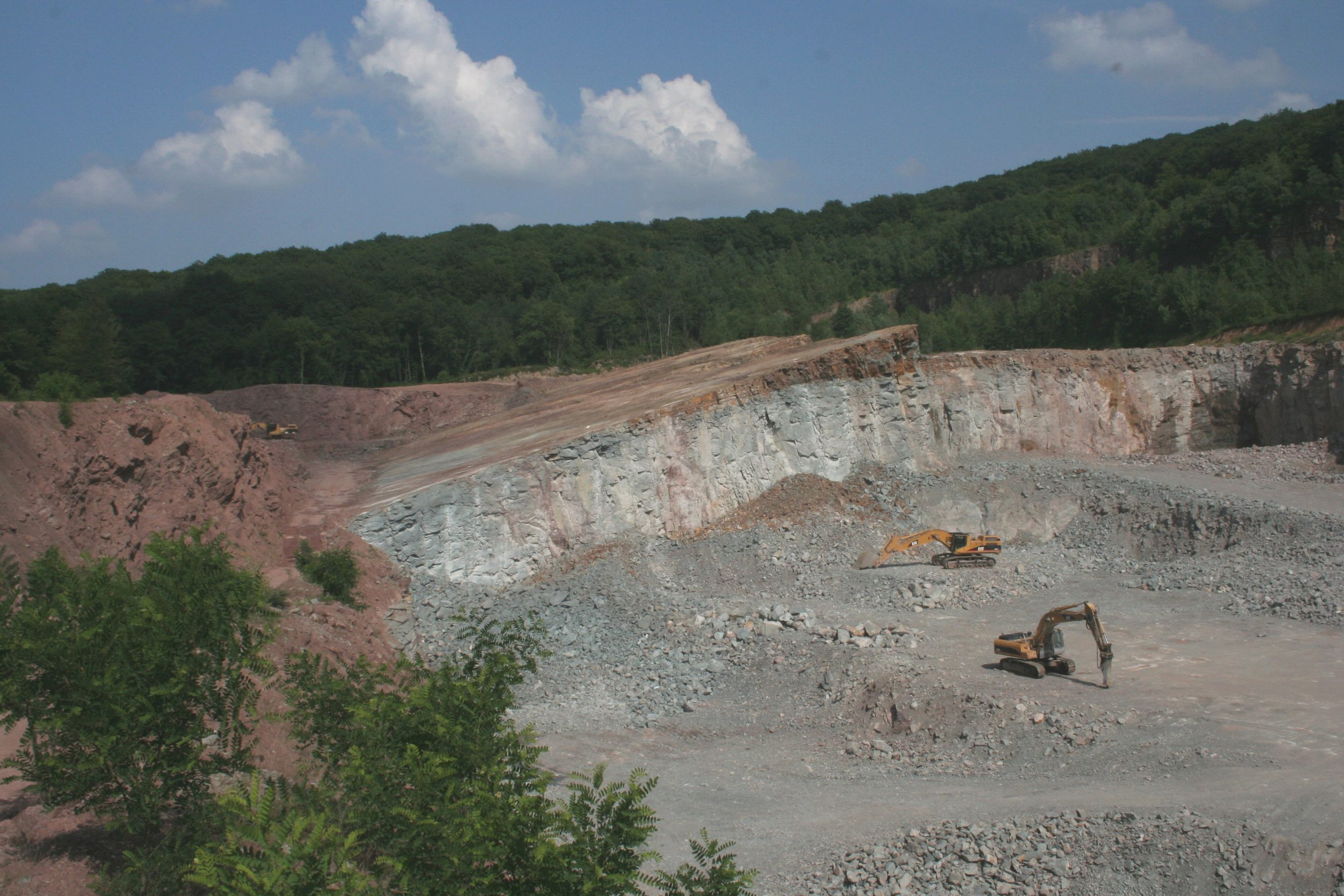
Eurite quarry in the Serre massif.

The only outcrop of Paleozoic terrain present in the Jura system is that of the Serre Massif, located in the north of the Jura department. During the formation of the Jura, the compression exerted by the Alps forced the basement to rise in certain areas and pierce through the sedimentary layer, like a massive punch, at the level of the Serre Massif. The massif is situated between a deep axis and a deep fault that connect the southern Vosges to the Charolais region. It is composed of Paleozoic rocks (granite, eurite, etc.) and Mesozoic rocks, separated by a fault.

Extent of the coalfields in the eastern part of France, three of which border the Jura massif.

In the Stephanian, deposits of organic matter formed two coal basins on the French side: the Jura coal basin, which remains unexploited around Lons-le-Saunier, and the Stephanian Sub-Vosgian coal basin, which was partially mined between the 18th and 20th centuries. The latter is located further north, between the two mountain ranges of the Vosges and the Jura, encompassing the eastern part of Haute-Saône, the Territory of Belfort, and the southern Haut-Rhin.

The Saxonian (Middle Permian) consists of siltstones, red sandstones, and conglomerates formed during the erosion of the Hercynian chain. It was identified through various drilling operations across the Jura and Doubs departments and through exploration campaigns between 1970 and 1988. Its depth varies by location, ranging from 200 m beneath the Lons-le-Saunier plateau to 2,000 m beneath the Haute-Chaîne. Its topography, characterized by a succession of grabens and horsts, results from the extensional system that was established during the Oligocene but was later interrupted by Alpine compression, leaving behind the Rhine and Bresse grabens.

=== Triassic ===
Due to their low mechanical competence, Triassic layers have poor exposure quality. Additionally, the significant tectonic complexities of this series, which serves as the detachment plane for the Jura's sedimentary cover, make it difficult to establish a complete and detailed Triassic stratigraphy. Similarly, the correlation between the Jura region and the North Alpine Foreland Basin remains challenging due to limited data. The Triassic stratigraphic series has a total thickness ranging from 500 m in external regions to over 1,000 m in the central part of the range. The Triassic outcrops mainly in the Lédonian and Bisontin thrust belts, as well as on the borders of the Serre and Vosges massifs on the French side, and in the Swiss cantons of Basel-Landschaft, Basel-Stadt, and Aargau. However, it is primarily known through various drilling projects and tunnels constructed through the Jura. The Jura's Triassic stratigraphy is largely derived from the German Triassic but differs from its German counterpart, which is generally thicker and subdivided into about twenty formations. Initially classified according to the traditional Buntsandstein, Muschelkalk, and Keuper tripartite division, it underwent a complete revision for the Swiss section.

==== Middle Triassic ====
The Buntsandstein is represented by the Dinkelberg Formation (Upper Olenekian to Lower Anisian). It consists of variegated sandstones (gray, green, and red) of fluvial to shallow marine origin, as evidenced by cross-stratifications. These alternate with reddish clayey-marly intervals. Local intraformational conglomerates have also been reported, along with associated paleosol horizons. The top of the formation is dominated by red argillites.

The lower part of the Muschelkalk corresponds to the Kaiseraugst Formation. It marks the onset of marine sedimentation, including dolomite, crinoidal limestone, and marl, often rich in ammonites, nautiloids, bivalves, gastropods, brachiopods, and echinoderms. Some levels also contain sulfides such as galena, chalcopyrite, and sphalerite. Dolocretes, desiccation cracks, and root traces document periods of emersion. Bituminous marls mark the top of the formation. The Zeglingen Formation, equivalent to the Middle Muschelkalk, is characterized by alternating beds of anhydrite and gypsum with marl and dolomite layers frequently containing magnesite. The upper Muschelkalk corresponds to the Schinznach Formation, which forms the transition between the Anisian and Ladinian. It consists of an accumulation of various dolomitic limestones and dolomites, featuring, from bottom to top: macrofossil-poor limestones, bioclastic limestones, limestones alternating with marls, and locally fossil-rich dolomites. Intervals rich in oolites and others containing anhydrite have also been identified. The top of the formation is marked by a high proportion of argillite and marl.

==== Upper Triassic ====
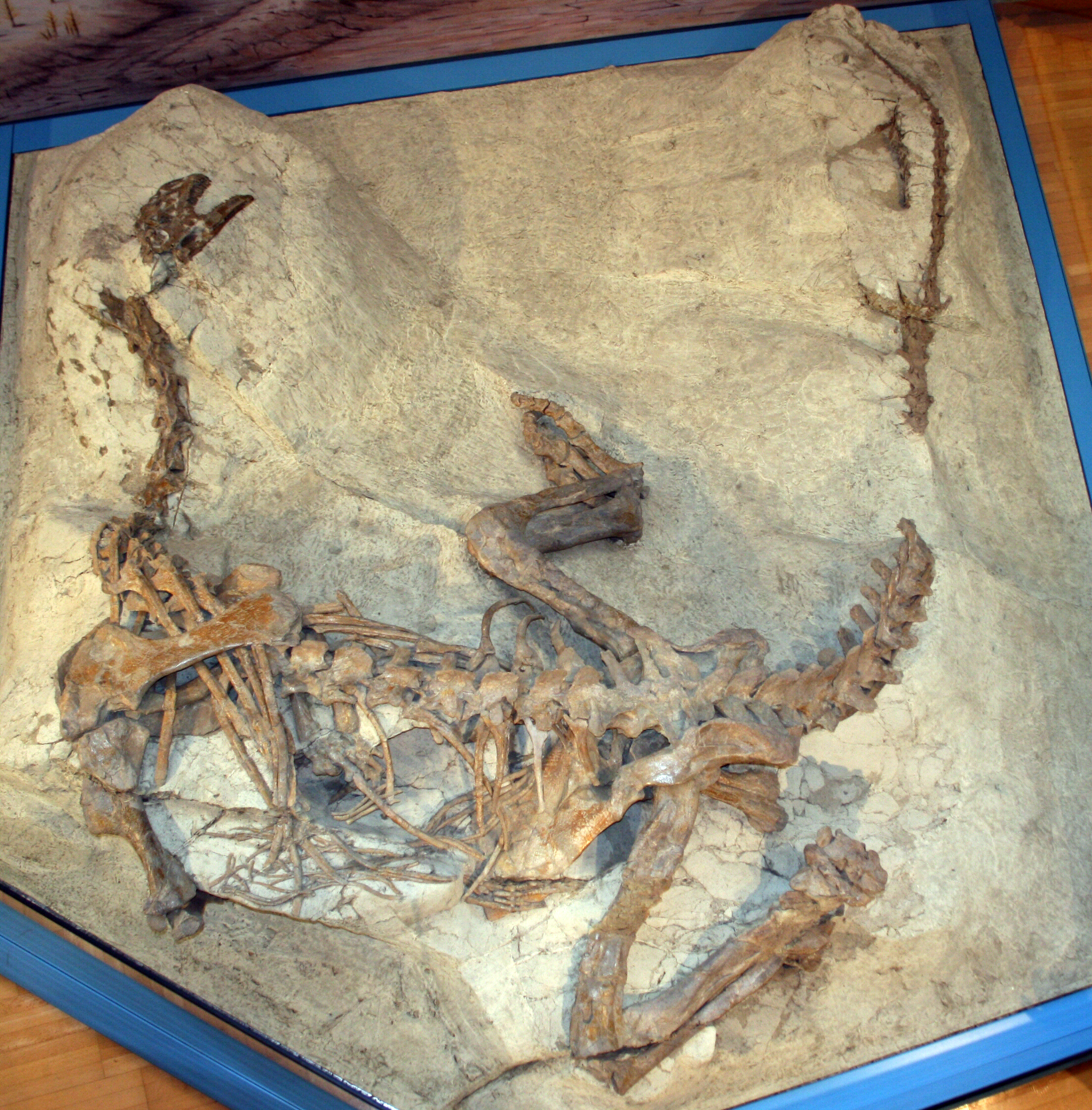
Complete skeleton of Plateosaurus engelhardti from the Frick site.

The Keuper is subdivided into two formations. The Bänkerjoch Formation was deposited between the Ladinian and Carnian. It is an evaporitic sabkha-type sequence organized into multiple regressive cycles where gypsum and anhydrite alternate with marls. These deposits are particularly exploited in the salt basin of Franche-Comté, in Haute-Saône, in the Jura department, and in Doubs. Fossiliferous dolomite beds and reed sandstones indicate marine and continental influences, respectively. Above this, the Klettgau Formation, spanning from the Carnian to the Rhaetian, marks a return to more clastic sedimentation. Silty marls, fluvial-origin quartzites, and sandstones rich in carbonate grains indicate a wide range of paleoenvironmental settings, from estuaries to shallow marine environments dominated by fossiliferous limestones and dolomites. A coal deposit in the Keuper was also exploited in Haute-Saône. Fossil remains, including complete skeletons of Plateosaurus engelhardti, have been identified in the Gruhalde Member around Niederschöntal and in the Hauenstein railway tunnel. A fossil-bearing level has also been found in a brick factory in Frick. Remains of Plateosaurus engelhardti have been extracted there, including one of the most complete skeletons. Successive excavations conducted between 1976 and 1988 have also identified teeth of Liliensternus and sharks, as well as remains of fish (Hybodus, Ceratodus, Lepidotes), aëtosaurs, Sphenodontidae, and cynodonts.

The formation of the salt deposit and coal of the Keuper in Franche-Comté.

=== Jurassic ===
==== Lower Jurassic (Lias) ====
The Lower Jurassic (Lias) is difficult to observe at outcrop; it is found only in the depressions of Haute-Saône, in the Avants-Monts anticline, or in the Jura-Bresse thrust zone. The stratum's thickness is approximately 200 m and remains fairly consistent from west to east, though thickness variations exist at different stages. The predominant rock is gray marl, with some blue marls, shales, and limestones. The abundance of marine fossils (ammonites, bivalves, gastropods, etc.) in these layers indicates that they were deposited in a sea rich in organisms. Small environmental changes in the marine setting led to deposits with varied facies. Lias deposits are also the preferred soil for the Savagnin grape variety.

==== Middle Jurassic (Dogger) ====
The Middle Jurassic (Dogger) is present on the western plateaus of the range: the plateaus of Haute-Saône, the plateaus between Doubs and Ognon, the plateaus of Baume-les-Dames and Vercel, and the plateaus of Amancey, Ornans, and Lons-le-Saunier. Some outcrops are visible in the Petite Montagne, the Avants-Monts zone, south of the Haute-Chaîne, and in the Salins thrust belt. The main rock types are limestones with oolite, marly limestone, and some iron ore. The stratum is approximately 250 m thick and spans four stages: Callovian, Bathonian, Bajocian, and Aalenian. The rocks are prominently visible on the cliffs of the reculées of the external Jura plateaus.

==== Upper Jurassic (Malm) ====
The Upper Jurassic (Malm) is predominant in the massif, with its layer reaching more than 500 meters in thickness. It is found in the folds of the Haute-Chaîne, in the Petite Montagne, on the internal plateaus of the Jura, in the internal thrust belts, on the plateaus of Haute-Saône, and between the Doubs and Ognon rivers. These rocks are visible in the cluses, with the entire series exposed in the Cirque des Foules near Saint-Claude. The rocks are almost entirely composed of limestone, sometimes dolomitic, sometimes marly, and sometimes compact. During the Purbeckian, small deposits of lignite formed in the Haut-Doubs and Bresse.

==== Dinosaur footprints ====
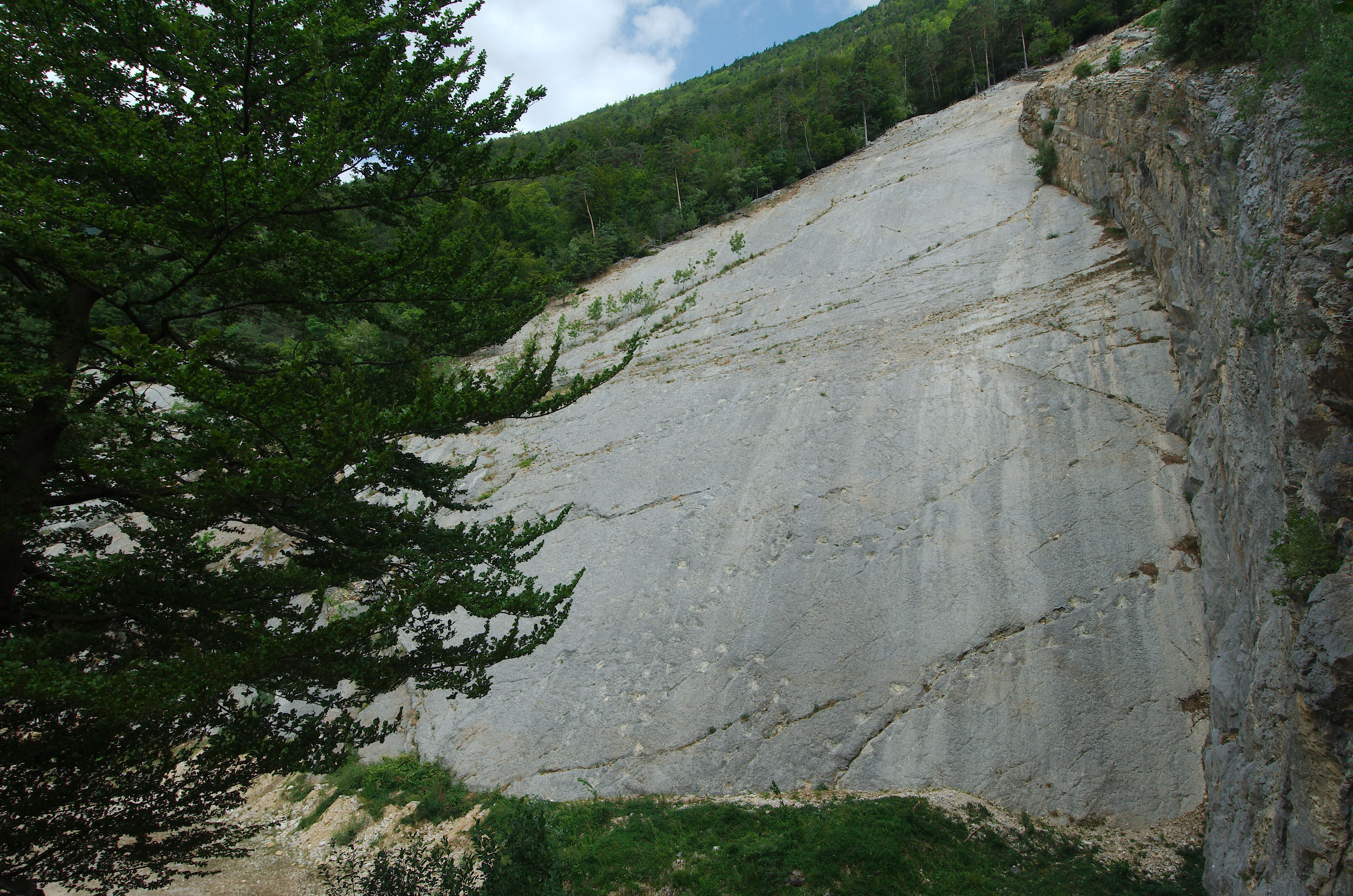
The Lommiswil tracksite, featuring sauropod trackways on a sloping slab (Canton of Solothurn).

Several dinosaur trackways have been discovered in the Upper Jurassic of the Jura. Most of these tracks were identified in northern Switzerland within the Reuchenette Formation (Kimmeridgian), which represents a tidal flat environment subject to occasional emersions during which dinosaurs left their footprints. The first major set of tracks is concentrated in the Lower Kimmeridgian, forming an extensive tracksite spanning approximately 250 km^{2} from Solothurn to Porrentruy. This includes outcrops discovered in 1996 near Moutier and Corcelles (canton of Bern), followed by finds in the Jura canton near Frinvillier in 2000, at Glovelier, and most recently along the A16 Transjurane highway during an archaeological survey near Courtedoux in 2002. All of these footprints are attributed to the ichnogenus Brontopodus, except for those at Courtedoux. The latter include sauropod footprints assigned to the ichnogenus Parabrontopodus, typically attributed to diplodocids, as well as theropod footprints defining a new ichnogenus, Jurabrontes curtedulensis. A second series of footprints, among the first to be identified, dates to the Upper Kimmeridgian. The Lommiswil tracksite near Lommiswil and the nearby locality of Grenchen, in the canton of Solothurn, were discovered between 1987 and 1989. Footprints initially thought to belong to Iguanodon, found at La Plagne near Biel/Bienne, were later confirmed to be from small sauropods. Additionally, three footprint levels have been described in the Tithonian stage within the Twannbach Formation at Pierre Pertuis and Twann in the canton of Bern.

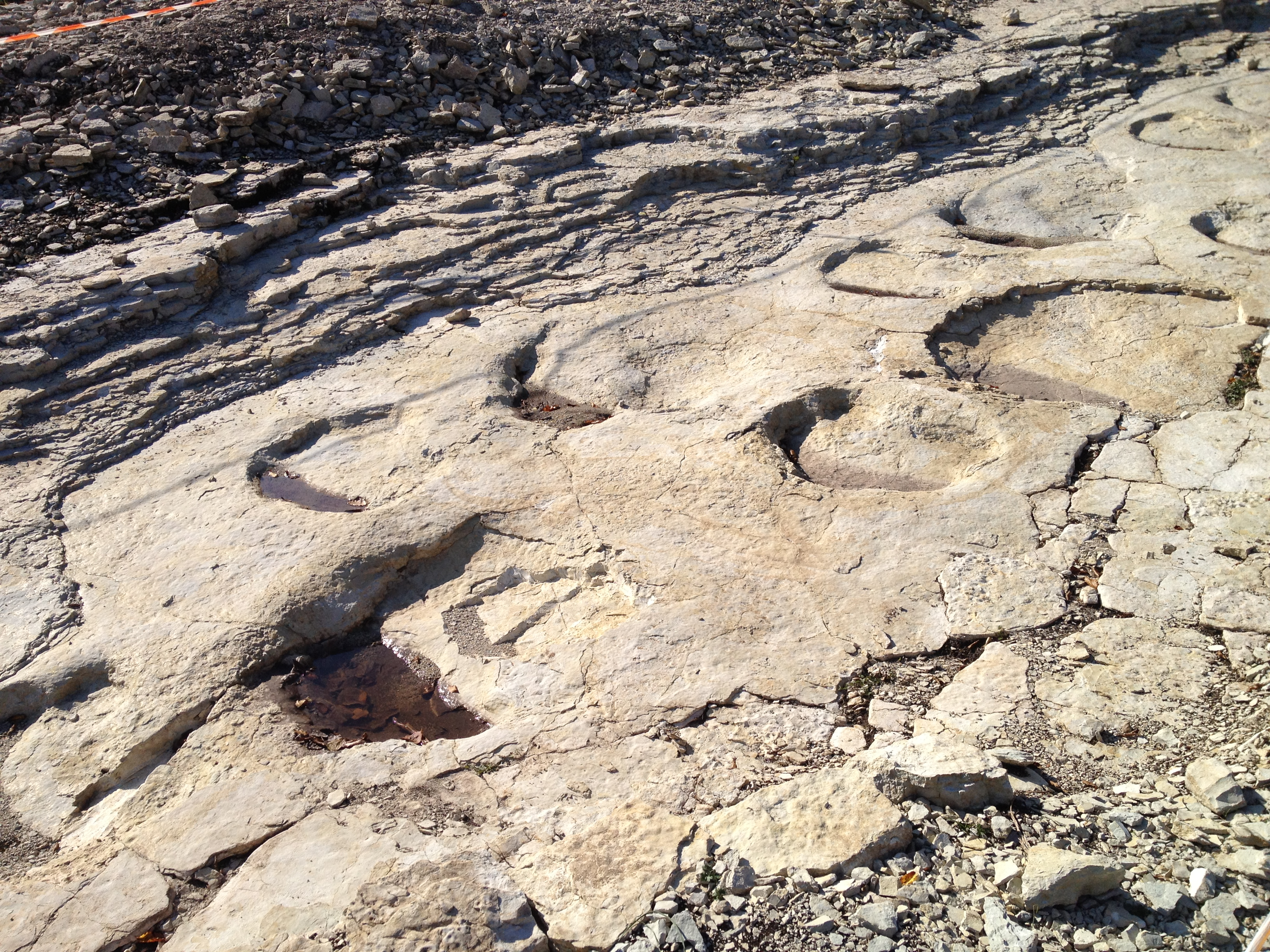
Sauropod footprints at the Plagne site (Dinoplagne) near Saint-Germain-de-Joux (Ain department).

On the French Jura side, three sites have been identified. (Note: Bichet & Campy 2009, pp. 102–103) The oldest footprints were discovered in 2006 in the Bois aux Salpêtriers quarry in Loulle. The footprints are located in oncolite and peloidal limestones of the Couches du Morillon formation, corresponding to an intertidal environment. The footprints are dated between the Upper Oxfordian and the Lower Kimmeridgian and are the oldest from the Upper Jurassic in the Jura. Three surfaces have been described, containing nearly 1,500 footprints and forming 23 sauropod trackways (ichnogenera Brontopodus and Parabrontopodus) and 3 theropod trackways (reclssified and attributed to the ichnospecies Megalosauripus transjuranicus). Each surface corresponds to different phases of emergence. A trackway measuring between 27 and 32 meters and containing approximately 170 footprints has been described in the Couches du Chailley formation (Note: The Chailley Beds Formation is described in the Swiss stratigraphic lexicon as the Chailley Member, belonging to the Twannbach Formation.) (Upper Kimmeridgian to Tithonian) in Coisia, on a near-vertical slab along the departmental road D 60E1. This formation is also interpreted as a subtidal environment, such as a lagoon protected by a coral reef and subject to phases of emergence (supratidal environment), during which the footprints were imprinted in the sediment. These footprints correspond to the ichnogenus Parabrontopodus. Their dimensions link them to Diplodocus individuals measuring 24 meters in length. Another outcrop located 1 kilometer away suggests that the site may be much larger. Finally, a last site has been identified in La Plagne near Saint-Germain-de-Joux, in the same formation as Coisia, the Couches du Chailley formation, but dated to the Lower Tithonian. These footprints are attributed to the ichnogenus Brontopodus, with some belonging to a newly identified species, Brontopodus plagnensis. Moreover, the site hosts the longest known sauropod trackway in the world, measuring 155 meters.

=== Cretaceous ===
Cretaceous terrains, predominantly limestone, are primarily preserved in the synclines (Note: Bichet & Campy 2009, pp. 112–113) of the Haute-Chaîne, the Salève, and the Vuache, where they can reach up to 200 meters in thickness. Overall, the Cretaceous is concentrated in the southwestern Jura and disappears east of Biel. The Lower Cretaceous series (Berriasian-Barremian) is relatively well-preserved across the Jura domain. Several Lower Cretaceous stages have been defined in Neuchâtel Canton, including the Neocomian (Neuchâtel), the Valanginian (Valangin), and the Hauterivian (Hauterive). However, formations from the Aptian to the Turonian are less exposed, while most of the Upper Cretaceous (Coniacian-Maastrichtian) is missing.

==== Lower Cretaceous ====
The series begins in the Berriasian with alternating limestone-marl sequences of the Goldberg Formation, equivalent to the upper part of the "Purbeckian" facies. It represents successive emersion cycles controlled by Milanković parameters. Deposits vary across a range of environments, including lacustrine, beach, intertidal, mudflat, lagoon, and bioclastic/oolitic sandbank settings. This results in diverse lithologies: oolitic, bioclastic, oncoidal, and peloidal limestones; green marls; black-pebble breccias; evaporites, etc. Locally, desiccation cracks, root traces (rhizoliths), calcretes, and black pebbles indicate emersion phases and paleosol formation under a warm climate with alternating dry and wet periods. These observations are supported by the identification of an assemblage of illite and alumino-ferriferous smectite in the green marls at the top of the emersion sequences, indicating soil erosion in a seasonally contrasting warm climate. The characteristic black pebbles of the Goldberg Formation are carbonate fragments (mudstones and peri-tidal packstones) whose dark color results from the dissolution of organic matter in a reducing environment. The drilling of the Vuache Tunnel on the A40 highway provided an optimal cross-section of these facies. Bounded at its base by the Tidalites of Vouglans and at its top by the Pierre-Châtel Formation, the Goldberg Formation forms a distinct valley or "Purbeckian combe" due to its high marl content.

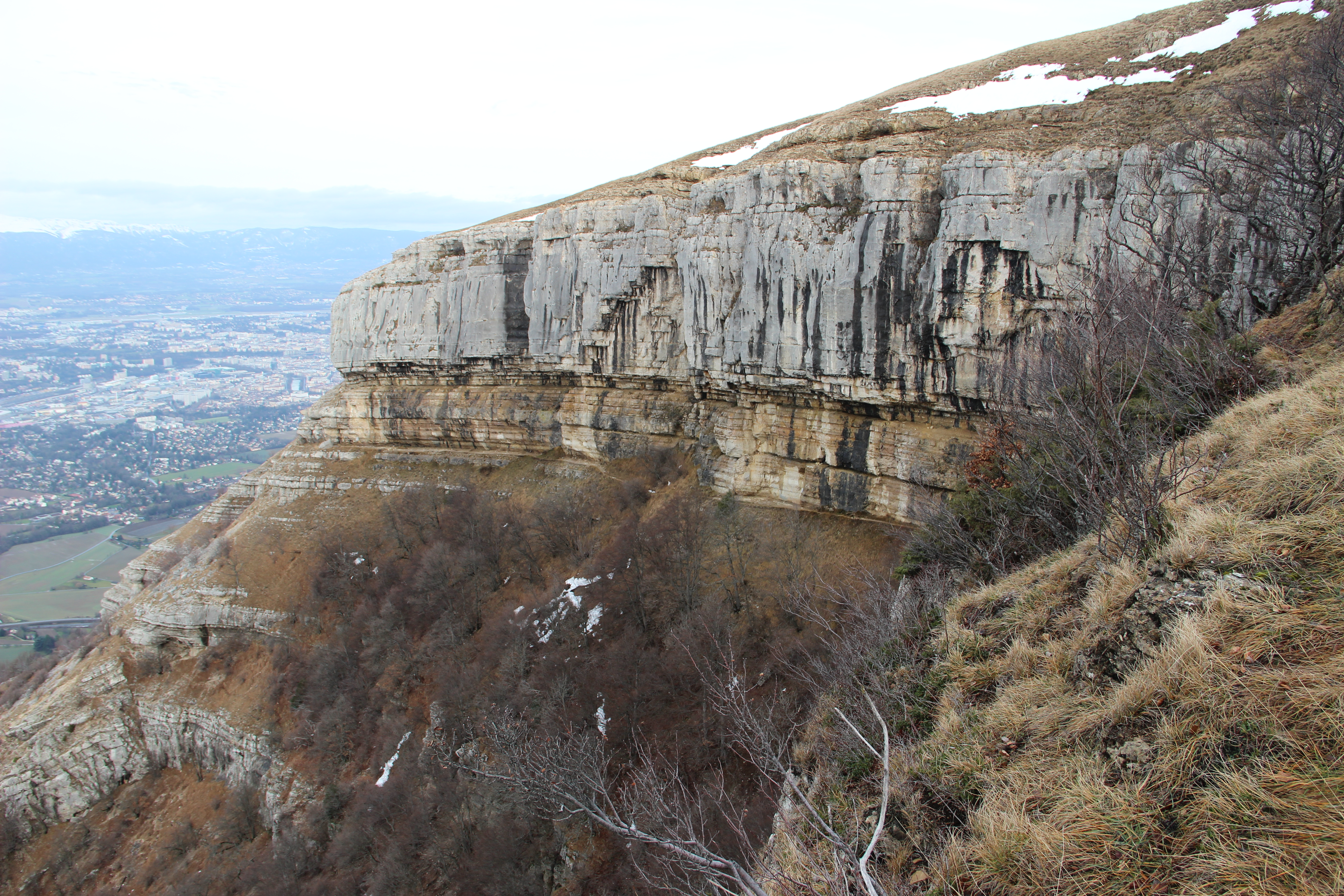
Outcrop of the Lower Cretaceous along the Corraterie trail on the Salève. The limestone bar at the far left, at the bottom, corresponds to the Pierre-Châtel formation. It is surmounted by a series of limestone benches forming a recess, the Vions formation, through which the Corraterie trail passes. The thick limestone bar overhanging the path corresponds to the Chambotte formation. Finally, the summit covered by a meadow defines the Vuache formation.

The base of the Pierre-Châtel Formation begins with a major transgressive surface. It consists of meter-thick bioclastic and oolitic limestone beds (grainstone and packstone), yellow to reddish, which evolve into similar packstone and wackestone deposits indicative of a lagoonal environment. The presence of coral, rudist, and nerineid fragments confirms a peri-reef platform setting. Charophytes indicate lacustrine episodes, particularly in the lower part of the formation, while karstified soils and hardened surfaces at the top suggest emersion and condensation phases. Breccias from the collapse of dissolution pockets have also been observed. Finally, sauropod footprints (Parabrontopodus ichnogenus) identified near Échenevex in Ain confirm the occurrence of emersion episodes.

Above, the Vions Formation generally forms recesses between the limestone bars of the Pierre-Châtel and Chambotte Formations. It also tends to thin towards the northeast and eventually disappears in the Bienne region. It consists of a succession of decimeter-thick beds with lithologies ranging from argillites and sandstones to oolitic and bioclastic limestones. The black coloration, linked to the presence of detrital material (quartz, iron oxides and hydroxides, and organic matter), the Thalassinoides-type bioturbations resembling shrimp burrows, root traces, and carbonaceous layers indicate shallow water to lacustrine conditions (charophytes and ostracods). Stratigraphic gaps are also evidenced by the presence of hardgrounds, ferruginous encrustations, and lithophagous perforations.

The Chambotte Formation consists of massive limestone beds, whose upper part is absent north of Seyssel and in the Swiss Jura. (Note: This formation was previously divided into two parts (Lower Chambotte Formation and Upper Chambotte Formation), separated by the Guiers Member and the Arzier Marls. The Arzier Marls and the Upper Chambotte Formation have since been included in the Vuache Formation.) Its rich content in oolites and bioclasts indicates a shallow, high-energy depositional environment (tempestites), along sandbars or lagoons. The lower half locally presents karstic infill, a malacofauna, and dwarf crocodile teeth (Bernissartia, Goniopholis, and Theriosuchus), suggesting periods of emergence following abrupt sea-level drops.

The Vuache Formation, formerly called “red limestone,” (Note: In addition to red limestones (which include the former Upper Chambotte Formation) and Arzier Marls, the Vuache Formation also contains limestones with Alectryonia rectangularis.) defines the Valanginian. It is characterized by decimeter-thick beds of reddish limestone with numerous cross-stratifications and hummocky stratifications related to storm episodes. These bioclastic and oolitic limestones, ranging from packstones to grainstones, contain numerous echinoderm and bryozoan fragments, with occasional glauconite or flint. They formed as underwater oolitic dunes. A conglomerate layer with flattened pebbles, 3 meters thick, represents a cemented deposit following emergence and was later dismantled during a marine transgression. The top of the formation in the southern Jura features condensed levels rich in bivalves (oysters), brachiopods, crinoids, serpulids, and sponges, deposited in an open marine environment.

The Grand Essert Formation marks the transition to the Hauterivian. It includes the facies of the Hauterive Marls and the Neuchâtel Yellow Limestone (formerly known as the “calcareous Neocomian”), now classified as stratigraphic members. The alternating fossiliferous marly limestones of the Hauterive Marls Member indicate an open marine environment influenced by waves and tidal currents. Above, the Neuchâtel Yellow Limestone Member forms cliffs of oolitic and bioclastic limestone beds, incorporating quartz and occasionally glauconite, deposited in environments influenced by strong tidal currents.

The Urgonian of the Jura has been the subject of much debate regarding its stratigraphic nomenclature and boundaries. It has historically been subdivided into “Lower Urgonian” and “Upper Urgonian.” The base of the Lower Urgonian contains a fossiliferous level known as the “Russile Marls” or “Russillian.” However, a revision of the Hauterivian in the late 1980s led to misinterpretations regarding the position of the Russile Marls (then placed higher in the stratigraphic sequence), which affected subsequent stratigraphic revisions. A new revision has been recognized by the Swiss Stratigraphy Committee but has not yet been applied in the southern Jura (Salève and Vuache) due to a lack of biostratigraphic data and relevant correlations. Debates also concern the age of deposition, particularly of the White Urgonian. Some authors attribute it to the late Hauterivian, while others argue for a late Barremian age. These discrepancies are due in part to the absence of pelagic biostratigraphic markers, the use of orbitolines that led to two different biostratigraphic scales (due to a strong paleoenvironmental influence on test morphology), and differing interpretations of nannofossil assemblages.

The Gorges de l’Orbe Formation incorporates the previously described “Yellow Urgonian,” while also encompassing the erroneously classified Russile Marls. Historically, it corresponds to the upper part of the Neuchâtel Yellow Limestone (as described in the 19th century) and the Lower Urgonian. Biostratigraphic ages fluctuate between the late Hauterivian and late Barremian. The transition from the Grand Essert Formation is marked by a series of unconformities across the Jura arc. The Gorges de l’Orbe Formation consists of alternating meter-thick beds of yellowish clayey limestone interspersed with centimeter-thick marly intervals. The limestone beds exhibit a wide variety of planar and cross-stratifications. They are regularly bioturbated, with truncated surfaces, and sometimes appear nodular or channeled. These are bioclastic limestones with grainstone to packstone textures, accompanied by oolites. The bioclasts, which are highly diverse and all transported, include brachiopods, bivalves, sea urchins, crinoids, corals, bryozoans, sponges, foraminifera, and dasyclad algae. They indicate reworking from a shallow platform into open marine environments. Quartz and glauconite are sometimes present in small quantities. The limestone beds differ from those of the Neuchâtel Yellow Limestone Member in their less yellow hue, the formation of less pronounced and depressed escarpments. Finally, the base of the formation is characterized by the presence of glauconitic levels, marly intervals, or significant sponge accumulations.

The Rocher des Hirondelles Formation (previously called the Vallorbe Formation (Note: The Vallorbe Formation has been reclassified in the stratigraphic revision as the Vallorbe Member within the Rocher des Hirondelles Formation.)) represents the upper part of the Urgonian, formerly referred to as the “Upper Urgonian” or “White Urgonian.” Its biostratigraphic dating is controversial due to debates over its calibration and the exclusive use of benthic microfossils. Initially considered isochronous, the base of the formation is now thought to be diachronous. It begins in the late Hauterivian and extends to the late Barremian in the southern Jura, while in the central Jura, it is restricted to the late Barremian. This formation consists of meter-thick accumulations of white to slightly yellowish limestone, separated by stylolitic joints. Cross-stratifications linked to tidal or storm events can sometimes be observed, as well as localized breccias resulting from emergence phases in intertidal or supratidal environments. These limestones, ranging from grainstones to packstones and even wackestones, are rich in rudists (bioclastic limestones) and accompanied by large benthic foraminifera (orbitolines and miliolids), dasyclad algae, charophytes, and, to a lesser extent, bivalves and echinoderms. They indicate a shallow platform to lacustrine environment.

==== Upper Cretaceous ====
The Perte-du-Rhône Formation spans from the Aptian to the Cenomanian. It is subdivided into three members. The lower part (Fulie Member), dominated by marls and rich in gastropods and echinoderms, represents a shallow platform environment that transitions into an open marine marl interval containing a great diversity of ammonites and nautiloids. The Mussel Member corresponds to glauconitic sandstone intervals. It describes a shallow platform environment evolving into an open marine setting rich in sometimes pyritized ammonites. Finally, the Poncin Member (Cenomanian) is again marly and restricted to the southern French Jura. Towards the northeast, it disappears, allowing the Narlay Formation to come into direct contact with the Vallorbe Formation. At Salève, the only outcrop of this formation consists of an encrinite, also called “Lumachelle du Gault,” which has been dated between the Lower Aptian and Lower Albian. The contact with the Rocher des Hirondelles Formation appears to be a discontinuity, highlighted by mollusk boreholes in the Urgonian limestones and fissures filled with the overlying encrinite.

Finally, the top of the Cretaceous succession (Cenomanian-Turonian) is defined by the Narlay Formation, which is only preserved in locally discontinuous outcrops. It consists of well-stratified siliceous limestone beds, white to yellowish. In addition to siliceous layers, they contain planktonic foraminifera, Pithonella, Inoceramus shells, and sponge spicules. These are pelagic limestones, historically referred to as white chalky limestones or flint-bearing chalky limestones.

=== Paleogene and Neogene ===
==== Eocene ====
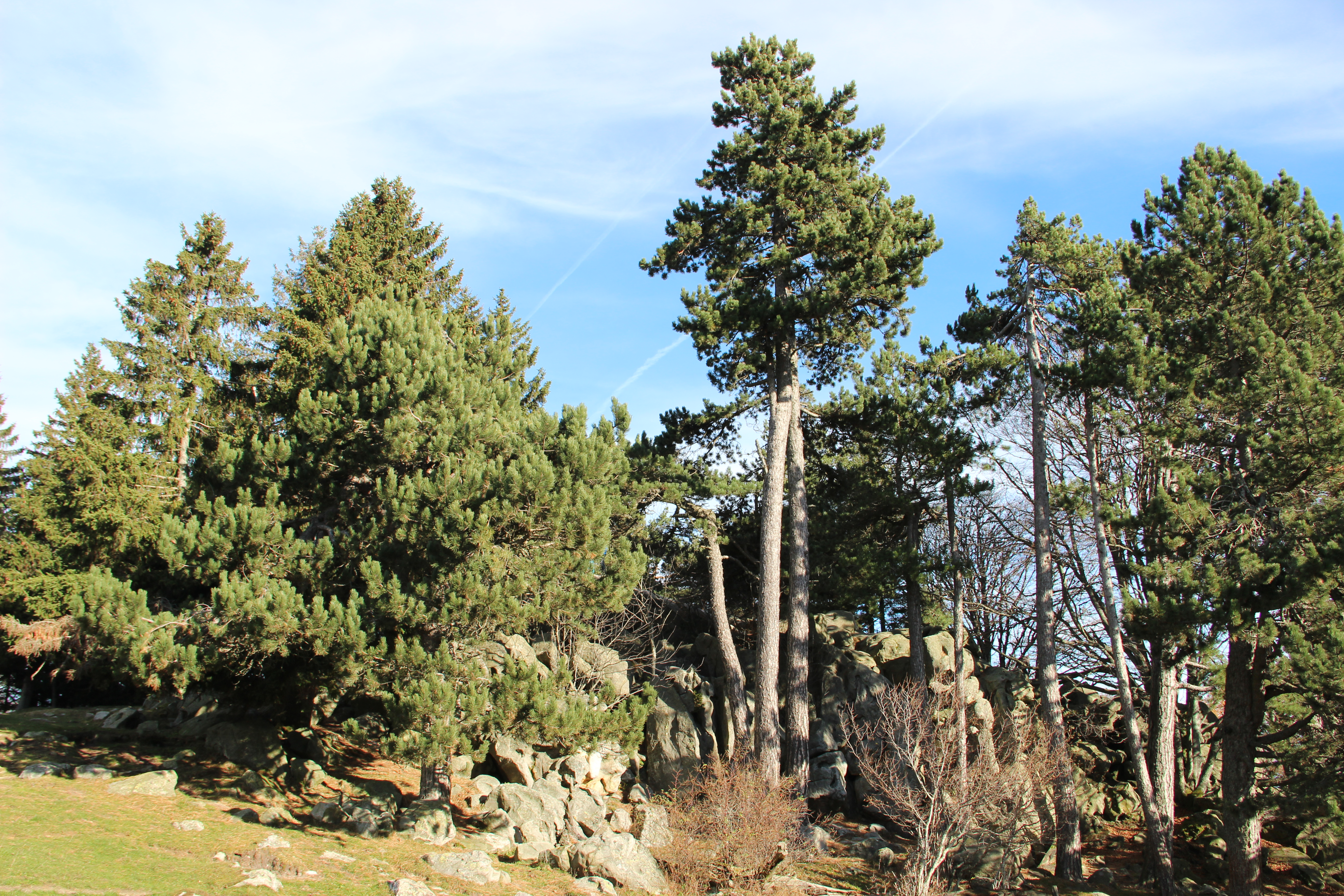
An example of siderolithic sandstone outcrop: the Faverges rocks on the Salève.

The sedimentary hiatus that began in the Late Cretaceous continued through most of the Paleogene until the appearance of siderolithic sandstones in the Middle to Late Eocene. These sandstones cover the Urgonian limestones but also fill paleokarsts, such as dissolution pockets or sinkholes carved as deep as the Upper Jurassic. They are highly quartz-rich sandstones (quartzites), sometimes associated with fine clayey sandstones and silty clays. The latter, formerly called "bolus" by early authors, exhibit an ochre, reddish, or purplish hue when they contain concretions or pisoliths of iron hydroxide (bohnerz) and are described as laterites. They can also take on a gray-greenish or bluish hue in the presence of pyrite. On the western edge of the Jura, extending into the Bresse region, flint-rich clays are also found. The sandstones contain trace amounts (less than 0.01%) of tourmalines, staurolites, and zircons but are devoid of micas. These are medium-grained sandstones, with microconglomeratic layers containing quartzite pebbles at the base of the series. The sandstones are massive, with occasional faint horizontal or oblique stratifications, reflecting fluvial transport, confirmed by quartz surface analysis. They generally appear white but turn reddish in the presence of iron hydroxide or oxide. Locally, glauconite can be incorporated, especially at the base of the series, giving a greenish tint. Their cementation is imperfect, making the rock sometimes friable to the point of being described as sand. The siderolithic sandstone series can reach up to 100 meters in thickness in the cantons of Solothurn and Bern, and 40 meters at Salève. However, their lateral extent is limited, as they are preferentially preserved in karsts, favoring the deposition of Oligocene molasses on Urgonian limestone. Their thickness increases from the Jura toward Salève along an NW-SE axis, with a growing proportion of sandstones at the expense of clayey intervals. This distribution also correlates with residual stratigraphy: clays were deposited in karsts carved into the Upper Jurassic on the western slope, where limestone series were particularly eroded, while sandstones preferentially cover the Urgonian series on the eastern flank. Their extent goes beyond the Jura domain and also occurs in the Helvetic domain. By analogy with their Helvetic equivalents, the siderolithic sandstones are constrained between the Lutetian and Bartonian periods based on dating from micromammals and mollusks.

==== Oligocene - Miocene ====
The migration from the south of the North Alpine Foreland Basin to the Jura domain's margin and the opening of the Rhine Graben in the north resulted in sedimentation differences between the two sides of the Jura uplift.

Sedimentation in the North Alpine Foreland Basin follows the northward migration of the orogenic front, with increasingly younger deposits prograding northward. The southernmost sedimentary covers of the Jura domain—now part of the Swiss Molasse Basin—were the first to be covered by lower marine molasse from the Rupelian (Lower Oligocene). In contrast, molassic deposits in the Jura, further north, did not begin until the Aquitanian (Lower Miocene) with the deposition of lower freshwater molasse, or possibly the Upper Oligocene (Chattian) near Yverdon-les-Bains. This deposition occurred not only on limited Eocene layers but more generally on a Mesozoic substratum, with which the molasse presents an angular unconformity due to the flexural deformation of the European lithosphere. Its extent is limited to the inner Jura massif due to its uplift and preferentially fills troughs formed by early Jurassic folding, the most significant being the Bellegarde-Bienne trough, which was then occupied by the "Lake of Locle." These molassic deposits differ from their foreland basin counterparts (plateau molasse) by their local detrital contributions from the Jurassic Mesozoic sedimentary cover and their lack of Alpine-derived pebbles. During the Jura massif’s uplift, this molasse became disconnected from the plateau molasse, now preserved in isolated remnants along the valleys of the Haute-Chaîne.

Along the Jura's external margin, the Lower Oligocene (Rupelian) is marked by alternating lacustrine and marine deposits (Septarienton), associated with deltaic (Gompholithes and Conglomerates stratigraphic group) and brackish deposits. These deposits indicate a subtropical paleoenvironment where Mesozoic cliffs were incised by rivers along the shores of the Rhenish Sea, which then occupied the Rhine Graben. The regression of this sea in the Rupelian facilitated the deposition of fluviatile molasse from the Vosges (or Alsatian molasse) in the Chattian. The rich paleontological diversity (Anthracotherium, Iberomeryx, soft-shelled turtles) highlights the transition from swampy to forested environments within a fluviatile alluvial plain. Sedimentation resulted from erosion of the northern Vosges, the Black Forest, and the western Massif Central. It was later overlain by lacustrine deposits from the Upper Chattian to the basal Aquitanian, which are well preserved in the Delémont Basin. (Note: Bichet & Campy 2009, pp. 120, 121–122) The Aquitanian marks another sedimentary hiatus, except for the La Chaux limestones and the gypsum-bearing gray sandstones and marls of Boudry, linked to the uplift of the southern Rhine Graben compartment.

The Burdigalian transgression led to the complete submersion of the Jura by the Paratethys Sea, resulting in uniform sedimentation and the deposition of Upper Marine Molasse along the internal margin. The sea withdrew at the end of the Burdigalian, making way for brackish coastal deposits (red marls and gompholithes of the Upper Marine Molasse) and, later, a vast fluvial-lacustrine system (lacustrine limestone and marl) of the Upper Freshwater Molasse from the late Langhian to the Serravallian. Further north, in the Delémont Basin, facies became more terrigenous, with sandstones and conglomerates. On the external flank, large, coarse conglomerates marked the formation of numerous alluvial fans at the base of the Vosges and Black Forest massifs. Deposits continued through the Serravallian and extended into the early Tortonian (Upper Miocene) in Ajoie.

==== Pliocene ====
Although considered absent, some authors have assigned a Pliocene age to detrital series originating from the Vosges, located in the external parts of the Jura massif, though without paleontological confirmation. A karst was discovered during the excavation of the Vue-des-Alpes tunnel. The leaching of detrital material filling the karst allowed for the identification of several micromammal teeth restricted to zone MN15, (Note: A biozone located between 4.1 and 3.2 million years ago, corresponding to the Ruscinian faunal unit. It is equivalent to the Zanclean and the lower Plaisancian.) dating to the Early Pliocene.

=== Quaternary ===
==== Glacial terrains ====
During the Quaternary period, glacial formations developed in the region during major glaciations. The deposits left by Quaternary glaciers, such as moraines, covered the older substrate materials, as the Jura Massif had already formed by that time. These formations are found along two main fronts: the external front, dating back to the Riss glaciation, which advanced to the recesses of the first plateau before extending toward the Amancey Plateau, and the internal front, from the last glaciation, which covered the Petite Montagne, followed the Combe d'Ain, and then ascended toward Frasne and Morteau. Three types of deposits can be distinguished: moraines, fluvioglacial alluvium, and glaciolacustrine alluvium. These deposits are highly visible in the Combe d'Ain and at the outlet of the Revermont recesses. (Note: Bichet & Campy 2009, pp. 128, 129, 130–131)

==== Peatlands ====
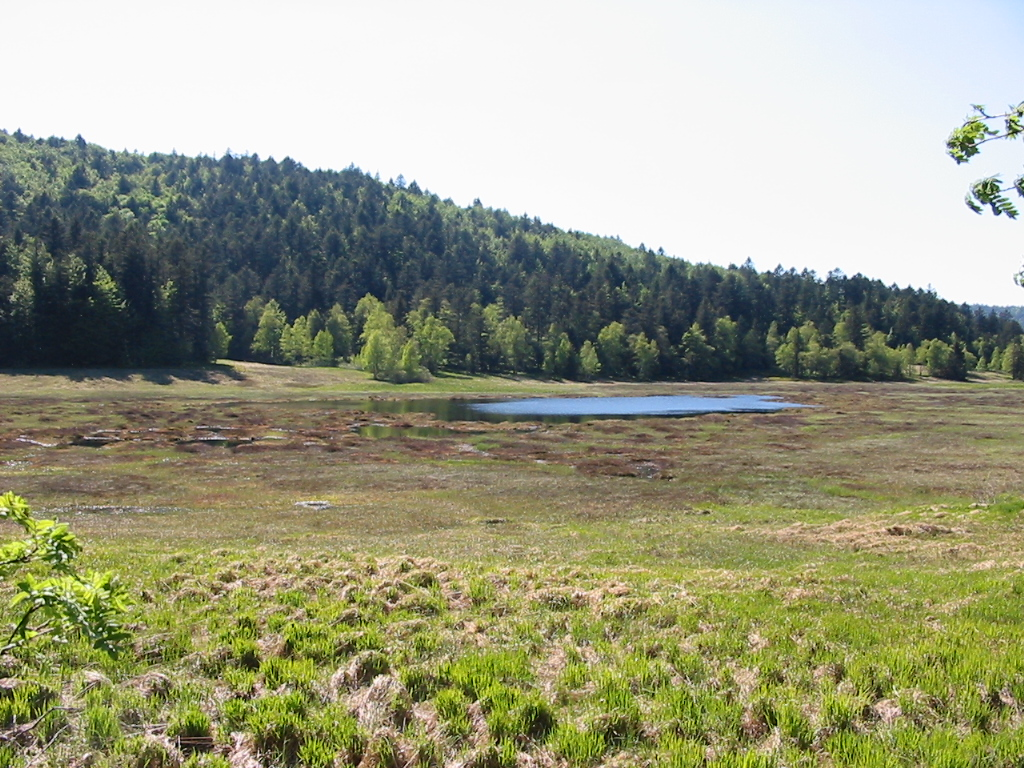
Peat bog in the Vosges.

A peatland is a wetland characterized by the gradual accumulation of peat, a soil with an extremely high content of organic matter, originating from plant material that is little or not decomposed. The Jura Massif has no fewer than 150 peatlands, all located in the Haute-Chaîne. These peatlands formed a few thousand years after the glacier retreated, occupying poorly drained depressions left behind by the receding ice. In these depressions, lakes formed and gradually turned into peatlands as they filled in. Among the vegetation found in these peat bogs are sphagnum mosses, which can thrive in acidic environments. (Note: Bichet & Campy 2009, pp. 138–139) Peat and lake deposits have excellent preservation properties, allowing for the conservation of numerous artifacts along the shores of Lakes Clairvaux and Chalain. Additionally, they have recorded climate evolution since the last glacial period, as their development captures pollen from regional plants, enabling climate reconstruction. (Note: Bichet & Campy 2009, pp. 142–143)

==== Alluvium ====
Alluvial deposits were laid down during the Quaternary period. Fluvial alluvium consists of gravel, sand, and silt deposited by rivers over time and during floods. These deposits include fragments of various sizes, originating from valley slopes due to erosion processes such as freezing, runoff, landslides, and rockfalls. Alluvial plains are environments where river courses shift over time. Alluvial deposits are mainly found in plains and at the base of mountain ranges. In valleys, they appear discontinuously along rivers; in deeply incised valleys, riverbeds contain very little alluvium. In Bresse, other fluvial alluvial deposits are found, likely spread by meandering rivers during the filling of the Bresse Graben. (Note: Bichet & Campy 2009, pp. 146–147)

Some fluvial alluvial deposits are not located in valley bottoms but on valley slopes, sitting at elevations of up to 60 meters. These appear as terraces, formed by a cyclical alternation of sedimentary deposition, known as alluviation, and erosional processes, known as incision. This pattern results from the Quaternary climate's alternating cold and warm periods. During cold periods, strong alluviation occurs, whereas at the end of cold periods and during temperate phases, valley incision takes place. (Note: Bichet & Campy 2009, pp. 150–151)

==== Rockfalls and slope deposits ====
The Jura Massif contains numerous slopes due to seismic activity, the nature of its rocks, and erosion processes. These slopes sometimes expose underlying bedrock, which is not always visible due to an overlying layer of loose formations called slope deposits. These deposits result from the breakdown and weathering of bedrock, driven by gravitational forces and climatic variations. In the Jura, three main types of slope deposits are distinguished: cliff-base deposits (rockfalls), marly slope deposits (landslides and mudflows), and gentle-slope deposits (colluvium). Rockfalls form talus slopes at the base of cliffs and rock ledges. They originate from the fragmentation of limestone due to freeze-thaw cycles. Fractured rocks and frost-susceptible marly limestones produce the most rockfall debris. Currently, active rockfalls can be identified by their lack of vegetation cover. Active rockfalls are rare in the Jura and are mainly found at the base of active cliffs with northern exposure, such as Creux du Van and Mont d’Or. The vast majority of rockfalls formed at the end of the last glaciation, during the glacier’s retreat. (Note: Bichet & Campy 2009, p. 156)

Marl can absorb water and become destabilized. The uppermost layer (1 to 3 meters thick) slides down slopes in the form of small landslides or mudflows, resulting in a displaced and often weathered marl layer known as marly slope deposits. These deposits formed abundantly during the last glaciation and the subsequent glacial retreat when alternating freeze-thaw cycles destabilized the soil. Gentle-slope deposits, which can reach a maximum thickness of one meter, consist of silts and clays that have been recently deposited by runoff during heavy rainfall.

== Geological history of the Jura ==
=== From the Hercynian chain to the Epicontinental sea ===
==== The Hercynian chain ====
The geological formations that constitute the basement of the Jura originated from the Variscan orogeny, which took place between the Devonian and Permian periods. This orogeny resulted from the closure of the Rheic Ocean due to the convergence of the Gondwana plate and the microcontinent Avalonia. The resulting collision chain, estimated to have been 5,000 km long and 1,000 km wide, with a height comparable to that of the Himalayas, affected much of Europe (Ardennes Massif, Armorican Massif, Bohemian Massif, etc.). The Serre Massif near Dole, along with the Vosges Massif and the Black Forest, are also remnants of the Hercynian Chain (Note: Bichet & Campy 2009, p. 274) near the Jura. In addition to metamorphic rocks linked to the orogeny, the future Jura basement incorporates polymetamorphic rocks of Proterozoic age, unmetamorphosed volcanic rocks from late-orogenic magmatic phases (Permian), and sedimentary rocks, particularly those deposited in coal basins. These NE-SW-oriented basins formed during post-orogenic relaxation phases and exhibit predominantly fluvial sedimentation rich in plant debris and organic matter.

The future paleogeographic domain of the Jura, like the rest of the Alpine system, was located between the Hercynian Chain to the north and the passive Gondwanan margin of the Paleo-Tethys to the southeast. At the beginning of the Triassic, the closure of the Paleo-Tethys was accompanied by the opening of the Neo-Tethys to the east and the formation of several oceanic basins in Europe, including the Meliata, which became the new oceanic margin of the future Alpine system.

==== Rivers and lagoons of the Triassic ====
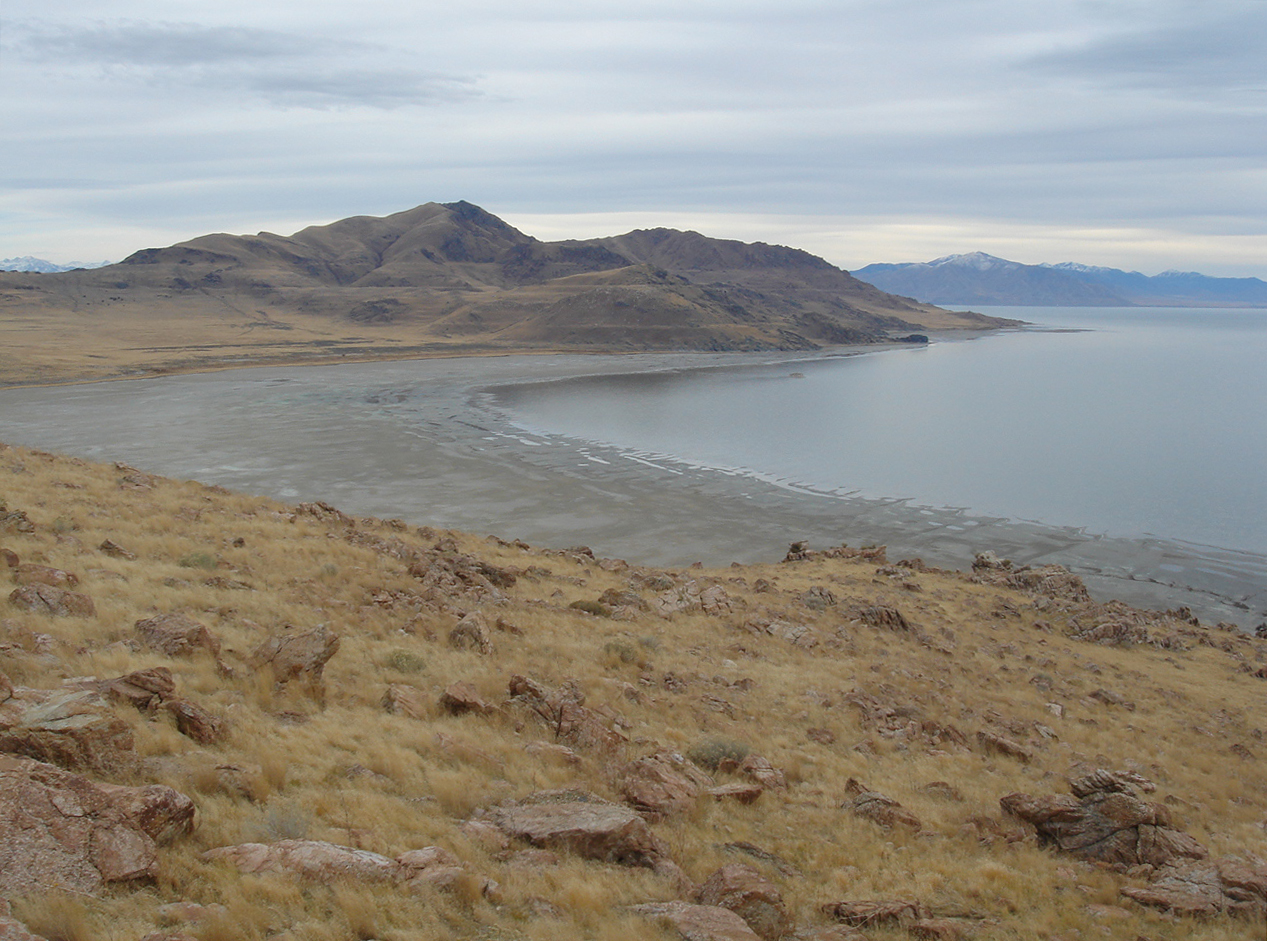
The Great Salt Lake, a landscape comparable to the Jura in the Upper Triassic.

The supercontinent Pangaea began fragmenting in the Triassic. The present-day Alpine system was then a vast continental area where Hercynian basements were exposed by erosion during a peneplanation phase. A fluvial system originating from the Hercynian ranges crossed this region, draining into the Meliata. These rivers transported large quantities of detrital sediments eroded from the mountains to the north and west of the Jura, which were deposited on the Jura domain during transgressive phases, forming the Buntsandstein. The arid climatic conditions at the time contributed to the iron oxidation that gave these sediments their characteristic variegated colors. These deposits form a major unconformity that separates Paleozoic basement rocks from the Mesozoic and Cenozoic sedimentary cover, observable in several locations in Haute-Saône. (Note: Bichet & Campy 2009, p. 276)

The first significant marine incursions occurred between the Anisian and Ladinian stages, connecting the northern European basins with the Tethys. A carbonate platform developed, corresponding to the Muschelkalk. However, the effects of the Permian-Triassic crisis were still evident, as these platforms lacked coral reef systems, and heterozoan-type communities predominated. Eustatic fluctuations led to periods of low sea levels or even emergences, allowing for the formation of coastal deposits (bituminous shales) and evaporitic sequences.

During the Ladinian, a series of regressive cycles led to a return to more continental conditions, characterized by the development of sabkhas and salt marshes. Coastal depressions were periodically flooded, forming sabkhas, which then dried out under arid conditions, leading to the accumulation of evaporite layers (halite, anhydrite, etc.), forming the Keuper. The region also contained a network of shallow lagoons (maximum 200 m deep), fed by rivers from the surrounding mountains. Coarse river deposits built beaches at the river mouths, while clays settled in the lagoons. The semi-arid climate alternated between dry and wet seasons: during the wet seasons, clays were deposited, whereas during the dry seasons, water saturation with salts led to the precipitation of evaporites, turning the lagoons into salt marshes. Further north, fluvial deposits dominated the Jura’s paleogeographic domain. The landscapes of the Great Salt Lake in the United States or the Dead Sea in Israel provide modern analogs for the Jura during the Triassic. (Note: Bichet & Campy 2009, p. 277)

==== The Jurassic carbonate platform ====
During the Middle and Late Jurassic, the Jura region was a shallow carbonate platform, dotted with islands under a tropical climate with fluctuating sea levels. Despite eustatic variations due to vertical movements of the continents, the Jura remained a shallow environment close to emergence. These fluctuations led to two nearly complete emergences of the region during the Jurassic: the first between the Early and Middle Jurassic and the second during the Callovian. These emergences are visible through variations in Jurassic sedimentary deposits, indicating that the Jura was a shallow marine environment sensitive to sea-level changes, unlike the deeper Helvetic domain. (Note: Bichet & Campy 2009, p. 280)

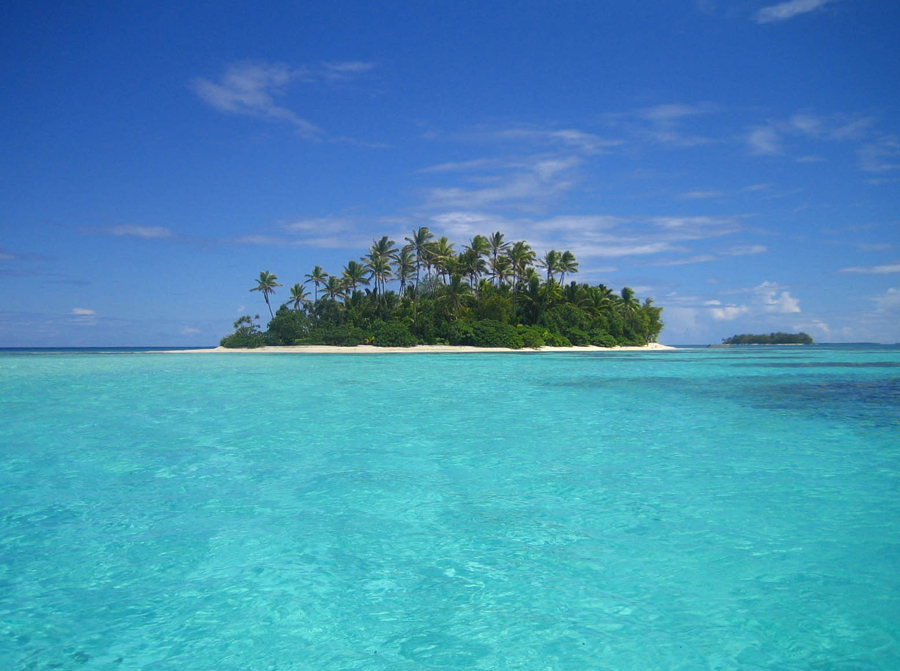
Landscape comparable to the Jurassic Jura.

The Jurassic sedimentary deposits indicate that the Jura consisted of small islands under a tropical climate. The presence of beach, lagoon, and reef facies suggests that environmental conditions at the time were similar to those of today’s Bahamas and the Federated States of Micronesia. These conditions (shallow water, good light penetration, warm temperatures, ocean currents, etc.) promoted biological development, leading to an abundance of microorganisms and benthic fauna (bivalves, corals, etc.), which in turn caused significant precipitation of dissolved salts in the water and the formation of calcium carbonate. The Jurassic climate was one of the warmest in Earth's history, with an average temperature of 25 °C. The dinosaur footprints found at Coisia and Loulle indicate that the islands were large enough to support herds of herbivorous sauropods. (Note: Bichet & Campy 2009, p. 281)

==== From platform to ramp in the Cretaceous ====
During the Cretaceous, alternating arid and humid climates, combined with eustatic changes and detrital inputs from the surrounding Hercynian massifs, controlled carbonate sedimentation and associated faunas. The Cretaceous is thus marked by the succession of two carbonate platform episodes.

The brief emergence initiated at the end of the Jurassic continued into the early Berriasian with peritidal evaporitic facies (Goldberg Formation) deposited in an arid environment. Desiccation cracks developed in a muddy foreshore alternate with oolitic beach sandstones, topped by caliches containing traces of root conduits. A major transgression marked the return of shallow carbonate sedimentation (Pierre-Châtel Formation). However, the return to more humid conditions at the end of the Berriasian favored the development of detrital sedimentation (Vions Formation), which in turn led to the establishment of a heterotrophic fauna. The presence of coal deposits also indicates the development of coastal marshes. The transition to the Valanginian is characterized by an increasingly arid and oligotrophic episode (Chambotte Formation). Beginning with the deposition of the Vions Formation, the carbonate platform gradually tilted toward the southeast, transforming into a ramp. Conditions became humid again in the Valanginian, fostering heterotrophic environments. Storm episodes associated with pebble beaches are recorded in shallow zones, while distal and deeper facies exhibit condensation levels (Vuache Formation). The transition from the Valanginian to the Hauterivian is marked by a deepening of the ramp, defined by ammonite-rich Hauterive marls (Grand Essert Formation), while the yellow limestone of Neuchâtel (Hauterivian) indicates a decrease in depth and tidal influence. A second carbonate platform, subtropical and urgonian in type, with a mixed heterotrophic-phototrophic fauna, was then established between the Hauterivian and Barremian. It consisted of an inner platform dominated by rudists (Rocher des Hirondelles Formation), protected by oolitic sandbanks (Neuchâtel Member), and an outer platform dominated by sponges and bivalves (Gorges de l’Orbe Formation). It developed from the Bugey region, prograding northeastward (central Jura) and southward (Delphino-Helvetic domain). This platform was subsequently submerged starting in the Aptian (Perte-du-Rhône Formation) due to a combination of rapid sea-level rise and tectonic activity. This led to pelagic sedimentation with strong condensation, characterized by glauconite precipitation and ammonite accumulation. Additionally, increased greenhouse effects during the Aptian and Albian promoted humid conditions and the return of detrital inputs to the basin. Finally, deep-water conditions persisted from the Cenomanian to the Coniacian, with the establishment of pelagic limestones (Narlay Formation), before a general emergence of the Jura in the Late Cretaceous.

=== Formation of the Jurassic Massif ===
During the Late Cretaceous, the opening of the North Atlantic Ocean, particularly the Gulf of Biscay branch, triggered an anti-clockwise rotation of the Iberian plate. Simultaneously, the African plate moved northward due to the breakup of Gondwana and the opening of the Indian Ocean. These two processes led to the closure of the Piedmont Ocean and the beginning of Alpine convergence.

==== Paleogene emergence ====
By the Paleocene, the Piedmont Ocean had completely subducted beneath the Austro-Alpine orogenic prism. However, because it was less dense than the asthenospheric mantle, the Briançonnais microcontinent—still attached to the Iberian plate—resisted subduction beneath the Adriatic plate. This resistance slowed convergence, generating intraplate stresses that were transmitted to the European foreland, causing lithospheric uplift.

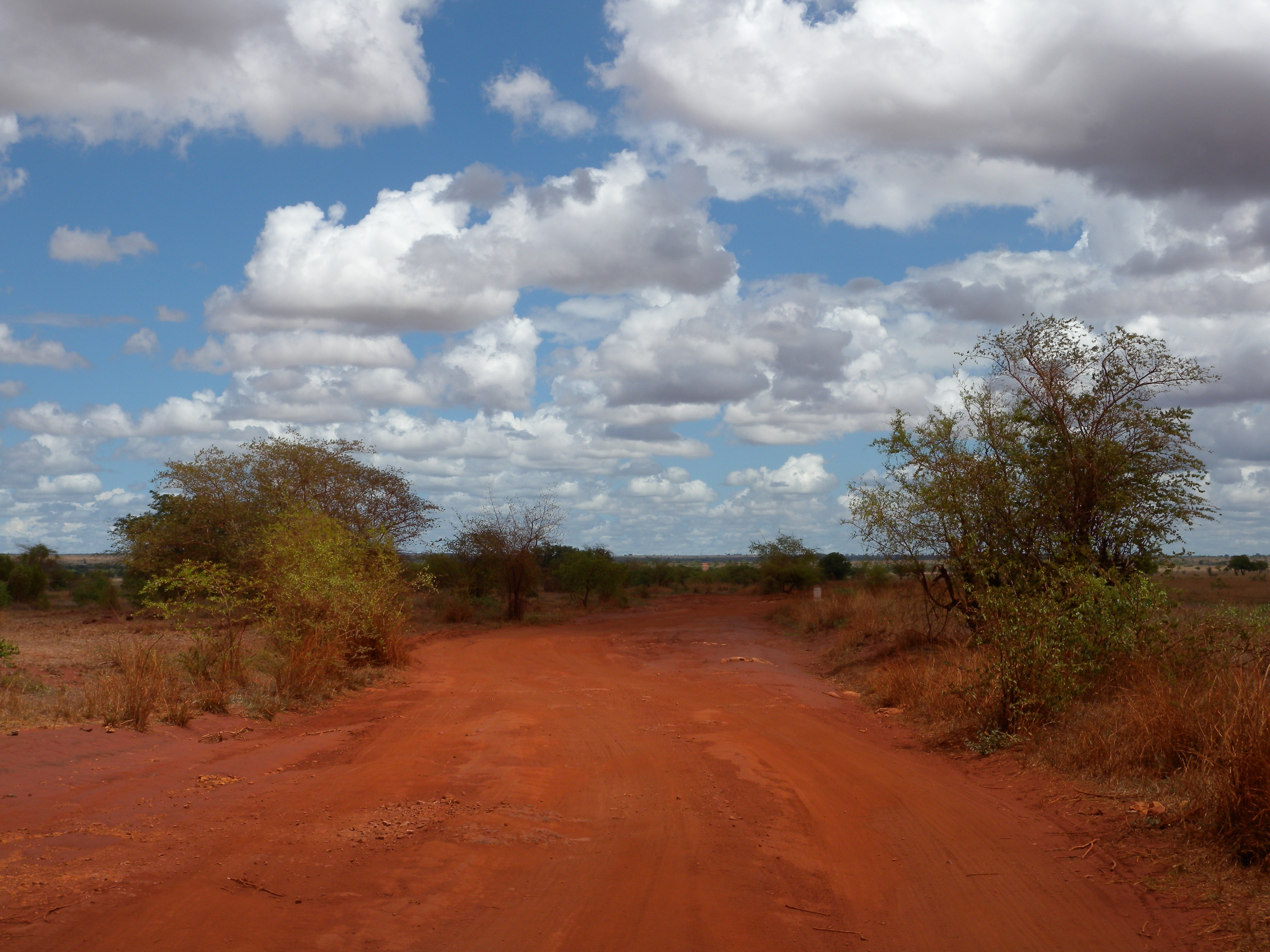
An example of a lateritic landscape with sparse vegetation.

The emergence of the Jura domain triggered a long period of erosion of the carbonate platform, continuing until the Eocene. This resulted in the development of an extensive karst system that eroded all or part of the Cretaceous deposits, exposing the Upper Jurassic on the western slope of the Jura. The system trapped detrital sediments produced by the weathering and dissolution of limestone, which accumulated in fractures and other karstic cavities. A hydrographic network then developed, draining weathering products eastward. The composition of these detrital deposits, particularly their clay content, varied depending on the eroded units: flint-rich clay from the Upper Cretaceous in the Bresse region, thick ferruginous-clay sequences from the Upper Jurassic in northern Jura, and quartzite and glauconitic sandstones from the urgonian limestones of Salève. The detrital material in these latter deposits is believed to originate from the dismantling of glauconite-rich series in the Perte-du-Rhône Formation (Lower Aptian–Lower Cenomanian), though some authors suggest inputs from the Massif Central.

At this stage, the Jura formed a low-relief plateau between the residual Alpine Tethys and the Hercynian massifs, (Note: Bichet & Campy 2009, p. 282) subject to a tropical or Mediterranean climate. Some researchers describe the karst system as a tower karst, while others compare it to Mediterranean karst hums. The absence of aluminum oxide or bauxite accumulation suggests recurrent phases of reworking alternating with periods of carbonate weathering, preventing laterite soil formation.

In the Oligocene, Alpine collision began. The Eurasian plate underwent subduction beneath the orogenic prism. The flexural deformation of the Eurasian plate led to the formation of the North Alpine foreland basin, where molasse deposits accumulated. As the orogenic front progressed northward, the molasse deposits prograded from the Helvetic domain toward the Jura, reaching it in the Aquitanian (Miocene) with the deposition of the Lower Freshwater Molasse. Simultaneously, lithospheric uplift beneath the Jura caused extensional fracturing of the Hercynian basement and sedimentary cover, with fault-generated rock escarpments being dismantled by erosion. Meanwhile, the Perialpine depression filled with erosion debris, and the Bresse region subsided to the west. (Note: Bichet & Campy 2009, p. 284) During the Burdigalian, a marine transgression restored marine conditions and led to the deposition of the Upper Marine Molasse, which was later followed by a general regression of the Alpine Sea and the establishment of continental conditions with the deposition of the Upper Freshwater Molasse in the Langhian. The Jura’s continental climate at this time was subtropical, resembling the modern humid wooded savannas of East and South Africa, home to primitive rhinoceroses (Brachypotherium), Deinotherium, and Hipparion. (Note: Bichet & Campy 2009, p. 285)

==== Neogene folding ====
The first signs of deformation in the Jura appeared in the Serravallian (Miocene), marked by the absence of younger molasse deposits, and continued until the Early Pliocene. This timing coincides with the exhumation of external crystalline massifs, which led to Jura shortening. The thrusting of these external crystalline massifs onto the Jurassic domain caused the detachment and deformation of the sedimentary cover. The detachment plane, located within the thick Triassic series, rooted beneath the thrust front of the external crystalline massifs, independently of the Bornes Massif. However, the weight and thickness of the molasse series in the North Alpine foreland basin (approximately 4 km thick) propagated mechanical stress outward, reaching what is now the Jura. (Note: Bichet & Campy 2009, p. 288) (Note: Sommaruga 2000, p. 153) Additionally, despite being located within the foreland basin, the Salève, Mandallaz, and Âge mountain ranges are also thought to have formed due to a decrease in molasse thickness toward the west.

The shortening of the Jura is, first and foremost, highly irregular from east to west. The covers located beneath the North Alpine foreland basin do not absorb any shortening, except for the Salève and its western extensions (approximately 5 to 6 km). In the Jura Massif, most of the shortening is concentrated in the high chain, which explains its significant elevation. Beyond this region, the shortening gradually diminishes toward the external Jura. The plateau zone exhibits rigid behavior, and thrusts have a limited extent. Finally, deformation in the fold zone is reduced to low-amplitude folds due to the thin sedimentary cover. These folds, moreover, overthrust the sedimentary covers of the European foreland, which are neither detached nor deformed by Alpine orogenesis, particularly over the Bresse graben. As a result, the sedimentary layers have retained a tabular arrangement toward the northwest. The direction of compression is indicated by the orientation of faults, to which the folds are associated, trending SE-NW. (Note: Bichet & Campy 2009, pp. 286–287) Furthermore, seismic profiles have demonstrated that the thrust planes do not root into the basement, which therefore does not contribute to the shortening. (Note: Sommaruga 2000, pp. 153–154)

The deformation of the sedimentary covers is controlled by the thickness of the Triassic deposits and their spatial distribution. The latter has a limited extent at its extremities, which influences the geometry of the deformation. Thus, a shortening of 7 to 9 km is estimated at the ends of the Jura Arc, while the central part is shortened by approximately 30 km. As a result, the differential shortening between the extremities and the central part of the Jura favors rotational displacement mechanisms: (Note: Bichet & Campy 2009, p. 289) a clockwise rotation of up to 26° has been estimated from paleomagnetic data in the eastern Jura, while the western extremity is affected by a counterclockwise rotation of up to 17°. This deformation is further facilitated by the formation or reactivation of sinistral strike-slip faults that cross the Jura along a WNW-ESE or NNW-SSE axis, such as the Vuache, Pontarlier, and Saint-Cergues faults. The activation of these faults, which occurred contemporaneously with folding, also disrupts the continuity of the folds. Ultimately, it is the combination of these mechanisms that gives the Jura its characteristic arcuate morphology. Beyond the present-day Jura, the burial of the Triassic layers (in the Bresse graben) prevents the continuation of the shortening.

In the Jurassic stratigraphy, hard rocks (rigid basement, limestones) and soft rocks (clays, marls) alternate. Two main units are distinguished within the sedimentary cover: the evaporitic Triassic and the rigidly behaving Jurassic-Cretaceous, dominated by limestones. It is this geological structure, consisting of units with different mechanical behaviors, that is responsible for the deformation of the Jura. Subsequently, the inertia of the detachment and the resistance to deformation at the front of the Jura led to the folding of the solid unit to absorb the induced shortening. The thickness of the series, the presence of intercalated marly layers, and the bedded structure of the limestones enabled the folding process. The Triassic cover is thickest beneath the Haute-Chaîne (over 1,000 m), and it is in this region that deformation has been most significant, as the presence of numerous salt layers facilitated detachment.

==== Quaternary glaciations ====
During the Quaternary (-1.8 million years to the present), the Jura was repeatedly covered by glaciers during glacial periods. It is estimated that around ten glaciations occurred in the last million years, but it is uncertain whether the Jura was glaciated during each one, as each new glacier erases much of the traces left by the previous one. However, it is certain that the Jura was glaciated during the last two Quaternary glaciations: the Riss glaciation (-120,000 years) and the Würm glaciation (-20,000 years). The last glaciation was more limited in the massif than the previous one, explaining the presence of deposits from both. However, these glaciers remained independent of those that covered the Alps. (Note: Bichet & Campy 2009, p. 290)

The current landscapes of the Jura massif, particularly in the Haute-Chaîne, are largely shaped by glacial erosion during the Quaternary. It is estimated that erosion caused by the Würm glaciation reached approximately 4,500 tons/km²/year, corresponding to an average erosion depth of around 6 meters. Given that the Jura was likely glaciated ten times over the last million years, it is estimated that around 60 meters of sedimentary deposits were eroded during this period. However, erosion was heterogeneous, as it depended on the relief and the nature of the rocks, leading to differential erosion in various areas. Additionally, the emptying of the marl-filled combes of the Haute-Chaîne anticlines was likely significantly facilitated by glacial erosion. (Note: Bichet & Campy 2009, p. 291)

==== Current Jura ====
Currently, Alpine orogeny continues to exert shortening across the entire Jura massif. This occurs mainly through strike-slip faults and, in some cases, thrust faults. Contemporary tectonic activity (neotectonics) and geomorphological indicators show that deformation is propagating northward via thin-skinned tectonics, with a long-term uplift rate of 0.7 mm/year in the inner southern Jura and 0.3 mm/year at the northern thrust front. Additionally, geomorphological evidence from the paths of several rivers suggests an average long-term uplift of 0.05 mm/year in the external Jura, implying deformation of the basement (thick-skinned tectonics). Some tectonic structures are believed to be linked to basement faults, inherited from Permo-Carboniferous grabens. Debate continues over the style of tectonic deformation (thick-skin versus thin-skin tectonics) and the measurements of deformation. A permanent GPS network (REGAL) has been installed in the Western Alps and the Jura to monitor the deformation of the Eurasian continental crust. Combined with semi-permanent sensors in the southern Jura, it has shown that horizontal displacement velocities are below 1 mm/year or 1 km/million years.

These deformations cause seismic activity in the Jura, though much weaker than in the Alps due to its external position in the Alpine system. No fewer than 300 earthquakes, with magnitudes between 0 and 5, were recorded in the Jura massif between January 2000 and December 2007. (Note: Bichet & Campy 2009, p. 292) Seismic wave propagation studies have shown that earthquakes in the Jura arc occur mainly in the crystalline basement, at depths between 5 and 15 km, and sometimes as deep as 30 km. The majority are located between 15 and 20 km in depth. They are generally of low magnitude (M_{L} < 3.5) and are concentrated along strike-slip faults. The low displacement rates suggest that earthquakes of magnitude 5 to 5.5 occur every 15 to 75 years, which aligns with current data (magnitude 5 earthquakes recurring every 50 years). The strongest earthquakes recorded during this period were in Saint-Dié-des-Vosges on February 22, 2003 (magnitude 5.3) and Baume-les-Dames on February 23, 2004 (magnitude 5.1). However, earthquakes can also occur within the sedimentary cover, as exemplified by the Épagny earthquake (July 15, 1996), which had a magnitude of 5.3 and was located just 3 km deep. Among the most violent earthquakes in the Jura arc are the Thise earthquake of October 26, 1828, which had similar effects to the Baume-les-Dames event, and the Basel earthquake of October 18, 1356 (maximum intensity VIII), which destroyed the city.

Due to Alpine compression, the sedimentary cover is uplifting. This phenomenon is observed in the region of Dole, where the Loue and Doubs rivers are migrating—the former southward and the latter northward. This migration is caused by the presence of a fault plane in the Chaux Forest that runs parallel to both rivers. The active uplift of sediments along this fault line causes the rivers to shift in opposite directions. (Note: Bichet & Campy 2009, p. 293)

== Geomorphological structures ==
=== Jura relief ===
Block diagram representing the morphological characteristics of the Jura relief.

The geomorphology of the Jura consists of two landscape units: the folded landscape found in the Haute-Chaîne and the "faisceaux" (narrow, parallel ridges) and the karstic landscape found in the plateaus. The Jura's relief results from the combined effects of deformation, which creates folds in the sedimentary cover, and erosion, which shapes these folds. The main features include:

- Monts: corresponding to anticlines
- Vals: describing synclines, generally bounded by two anticlines
- Cluses: gorges cutting perpendicularly across one or more anticlines
- Ruz: similar to a cluse but eroding only one flank of an anticline
- Combes: longitudinal depressions carved into the hinge of an anticlinal fold
- Hogback: ridges that surround and overlook combes, along with "monts dérivés," which form due to differential erosion of more resistant limestone layers emerging from the combe floor
- Inverted relief: occurs when erosion completely levels a mont, turning it into a valley.

=== Karsts ===
Due to its limestone composition, the Jura massif is highly conducive to karst formation, both on the surface (epikarst or exokarst) and underground (endokarst). These formations develop preferentially in the Lower to Middle Jurassic limestone series. The earliest evidence of karst development dates back to the Eocene, with the emergence of the carbonate platform and the formation of an epikarst later filled by siderolithic sandstones. Raymond Enay described this as an "eogenic surface," resulting from weathering processes that led to lateritic paleosols and reworked sands, particularly visible at the Salève. During the Oligocene, this eogenic surface was more active in the external Jura, due to higher elevation, and continued cutting into the Upper Jurassic layers, eventually reaching the Lower Cretaceous layers on the inner margin. The Jura's tilt reversed starting in the Miocene, allowing continued epikarst development, which was locally preserved by Upper Marine Molasse deposits. Some karstification occurred beneath a vegetative and soil cover. The first endokarsts likely formed in the Miocene, as suggested by sedimentary fillings in the Hautecourt cave. The erosion rate is estimated to have been around 5 mm per millennium during the Eocene-Miocene period.

From the late Miocene onward, the uplift of the Jura massif increased elevation differences relative to the base level (represented by the Swiss Plateau and the Bresse Graben), enhancing surface runoff. This process led to deeper valley incision and the formation of the first Jura cluses, as well as the development of underground karsts. The endokarsts also benefited from the intense fracturing of Jurassic units caused by uplift, while surface water drainage followed major synclinal axes. The Pliocene was marked by increased precipitation due to global cooling, which further enhanced carbonate dissolution. These combined processes led to a higher erosion rate, estimated between 50 and 80 mm per millennium for the Pliocene-Quaternary period, explaining the retreat of Middle Jurassic escarpments in the external Jura and the stripping of Upper Jurassic layers from anticlinal crests.

During the Quaternary glaciations, the process of karstification alternated with phases of glacial erosion. The development of epikarst was active during interglacial stages, during which erosion continued with valley deepening. However, the stabilization of the base level during the Pliocene (as the subsidence of the Bresse Graben no longer allowed the deposition of thick sedimentary sequences) and the weaker uplift of the Jura mitigated its impact. Conversely, advancing glaciers erased epikarstic features through scraping (widening valleys and gorges) or buried them under fluvioglacial sediments. Then, during glacial retreat, the intense runoff generated by glacial melting led to a brief period of optimal karst activity. Finally, while endokarsts remained unaffected by direct glacial action, their development during glacial stages could be hindered by clogging with varved silts.

=== Plateaus ===
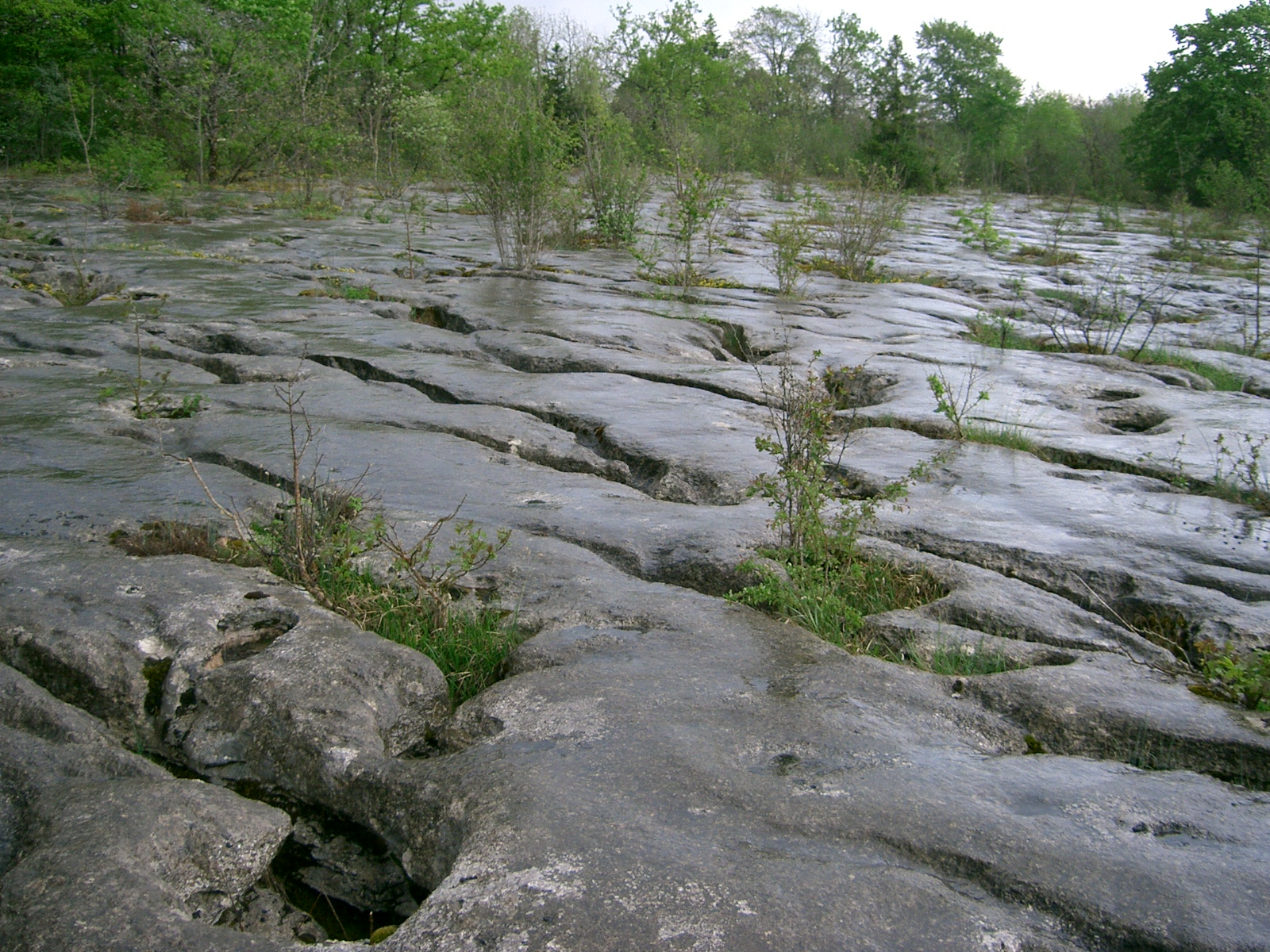
The limestone pavements of Loulle.

The outcrops on the plateaus consist exclusively of Jurassic limestones (Cretaceous layers having been completely eroded during the Jura’s folding). The intense fracturing of these limestones makes them permeable to rainwater, so surface watercourses are extremely rare on these plateaus, as all the water infiltrates the rock and feeds springs located below. This water erodes the limestone’s surface and enlarges fractures, giving rise to micro-reliefs characteristic of karst landscapes: lapiaz or limestone pavements. In deeper layers, the water carves out an extensive network of galleries, sinkholes, and caves; however, recognized networks represent only a tiny fraction of the cavities within the limestone mass of the plateaus. (Note: Bichet & Campy 2009, p. 164) Water infiltration also carries decalcification clays into karst pockets, leading to highly irregular soil thickness and quality for agriculture. (Note: Bichet & Campy 2009, p. 165)

The drying of the Jura plateaus has been a persistent challenge for human habitation. Various methods were historically used to retain water: storage cisterns, reservoirs filled by tanker trucks, etc. Even the smallest spring retained by a marl layer was developed for livestock. The irregularity of the plateau soils makes some areas fertile while others are left fallow for forests or used as pastures. In places without decalcification clays, plowing directly tears up limestone slabs near the soil’s surface, which are then used to build walls between plots. (Note: Bichet & Campy 2009, pp. 164–165)

=== Blind valleys ===
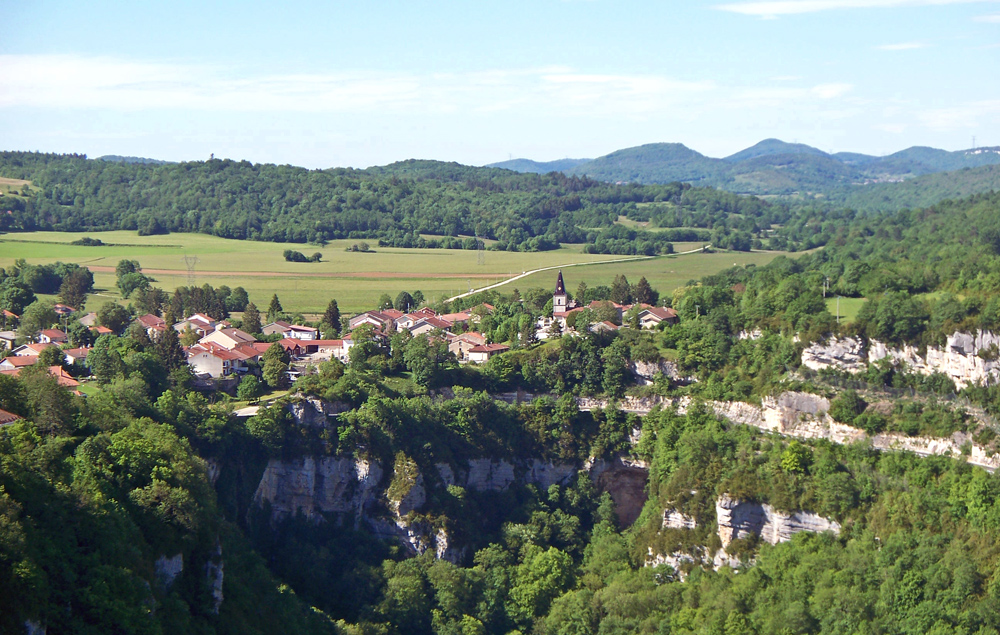
Blind valleys of Corveissiat.

The blind valleys are one of the most typical landscapes of the Jura Massif. A blind valley is a valley that extends into a horizontally layered limestone plateau and abruptly ends in a limestone cirque at the base of which a resurgence emerges. (Note: Bichet & Campy 2009, p. 168) Three main groups of blind valleys have been identified: the blind valleys of the Lédonian Plateau (7 reculées), which are the most typical and well-known; the blind valleys of the Ornans/Amancey Plateau (4 reculées), which are the longest in the Jura; and the blind valleys of the Champagnole Plateau (6 blind valleys). Additionally, two other blind valleys slightly incise the Levier/Nozeroy Plateau in the upper courses of the Ain and Loue rivers.

==== Origin of the blind valleys ====
The blind valleys are not randomly located but are found in erosion-prone areas that often correspond to fault lines. Locally, they result from the gradual collapse of rocks above rivers. Internal blind valleys were formed during the progressive uplift of the Jura due to faults, which acted as "guides" for their development. Before the fault formed, the landscape consisted of a Jurassic limestone cover over a marly substratum. A fault then fractured the terrain, creating a lowered and an elevated compartment. Plateau erosion eventually leveled these compartments, and surface and underground water flows converged toward the fault, which acted as a drainage channel. Upon reaching the soft marls of the elevated compartment, erosion accelerated, carving out a small valley—the precursor to the reculée. Finally, continued retreat of valley slopes and persistent water flow convergence toward the fault resulted in rapid deepening at the fault’s location. In limestone areas, steep cliffs formed, while in marly sections, the slope remained steep but less abrupt, shaping the reculée. (Note: Bichet & Campy 2009, p. 176)

The origin of external blind valleys is linked to the collapse of the Bresse Basin during the Oligocene. This collapse created a fault scarp along the edge of the Jura plateau. The impermeability of Upper Jurassic formations, which outcrop on the plateau, led to the formation of a surface water network. Regressive erosion from the Bresse side carved incisions into the plateau’s edge, which would later develop into reculées. By the end of the Oligocene, as the Bresse Basin continued to subside, it filled with detrital deposits resulting from the erosion of the plateau, where the Upper Jurassic layer gradually thinned. Precursor blind valleys continued to deepen slowly, while the surface water network on the plateau remained active. At the beginning of the Miocene, the subsidence of the Bresse Basin persisted, causing an increase in sediment deposition. As the plateau eroded further, Middle Jurassic layers were exposed, and the surface water network began to cut deeper into the karstified substratum. The blind valleys gradually took shape, aligning with the fault directions of the plateau. By the late Miocene and early Pliocene, the Jura was thrust over the Bresse, forming the Lons-le-Saunier fold belt. The blind valleys continued to evolve. Both internal and external blind valleys were further shaped during the Quaternary period, when glacial tongues from advancing glaciers widened their valleys. Even today, blind valleys continue to develop, with water remaining the primary agent of erosion. (Note: Bichet & Campy 2009, p. 177)

==== The blind valleys of the Lédonien Plateau ====
These blind valleys served as the model for defining the term "reculée." They cut through the stratigraphic series of the Middle Jurassic and Lias formations that make up the plateau. Modest rivers flow through these reculées, draining the underground waters of the plateau toward the Bresse region, such as the Vallière and the Seille. Not all blind valleys on the plateau strictly conform to the precise definition of a blind valley, as geological organization varies from place to place, along with derivative landforms. Four blind valleys meet the definition: the blind valley of Arbois, the blind valley of Poligny, the blind valley of Baume-les-Messieurs, and the blind valley of Revigny. Three others only partially fit the definition: the blind valley of Salins-les-Bains, the blind valley of Miéry, and the blind valley of Vernantois. (Note: Bichet & Campy 2009, p. 170)

==== The blind valleys of the Ornans/Valdahon Plateau ====
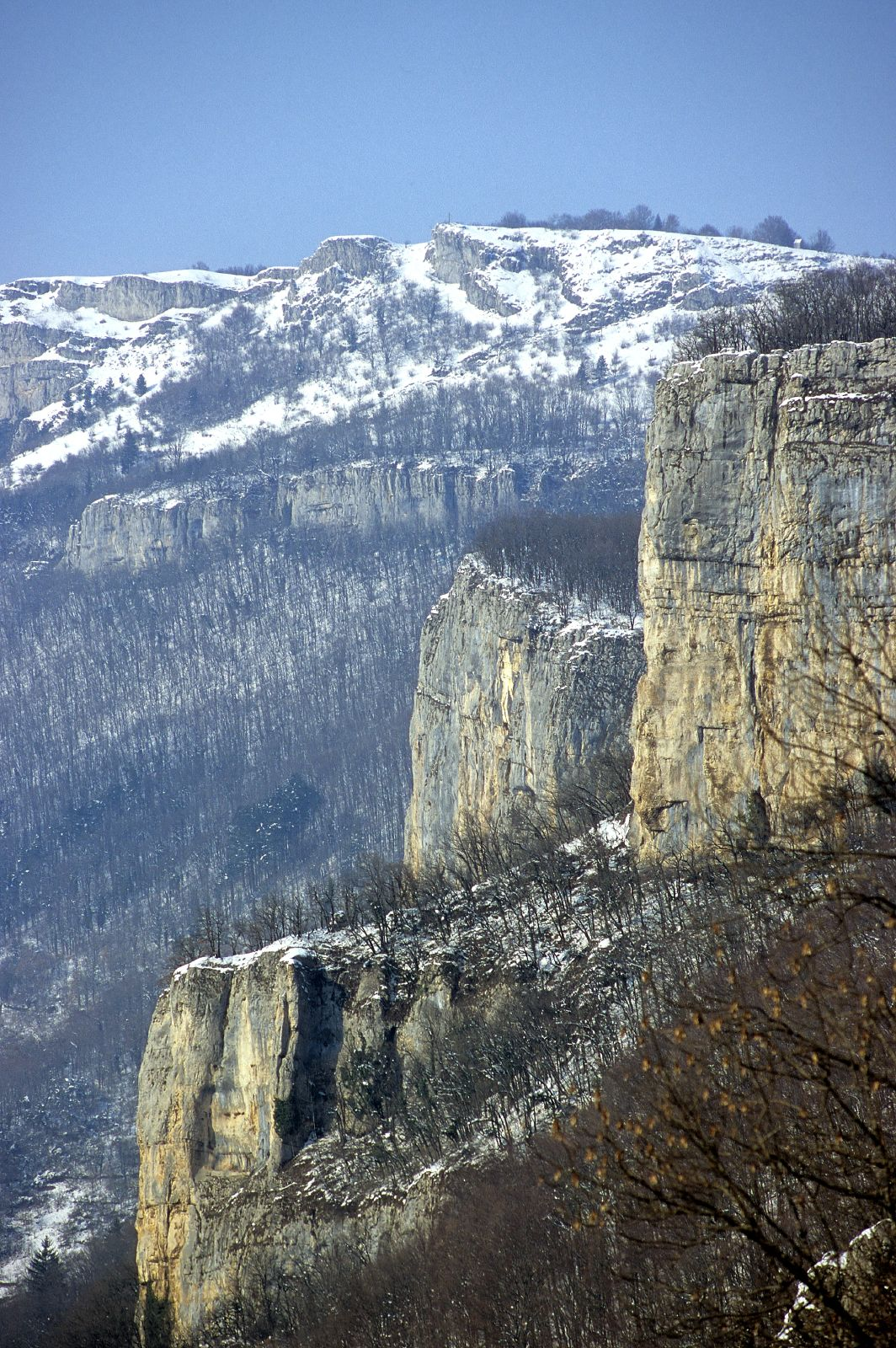
Blind valley of Loue.

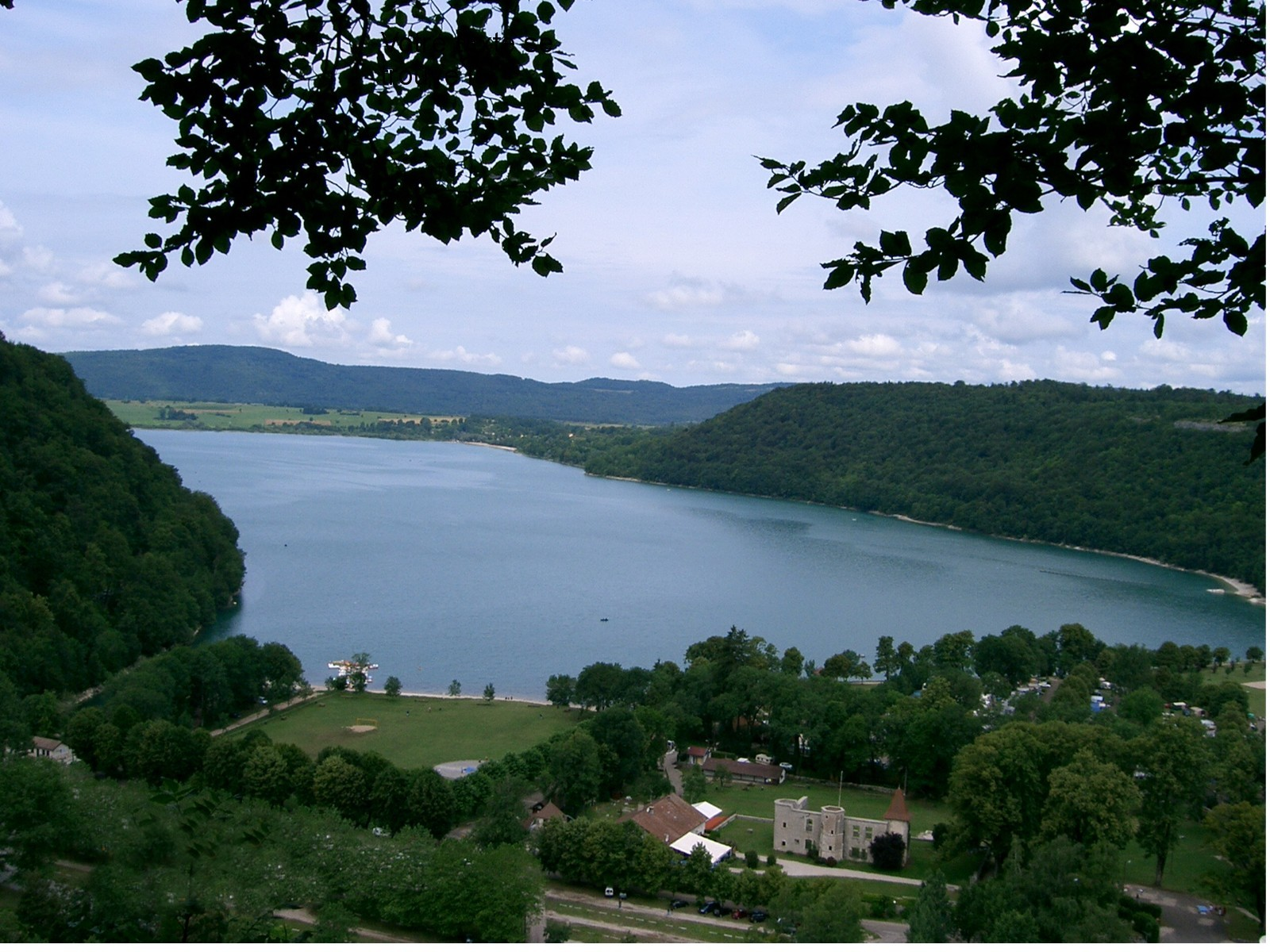
Lac de Chalain in its remote cove.

Four blind valleys traverse these plateaus. They are distinguished by their length and, in the case of the blind valley of the Loue and the blind valley of Lison, by their complexity. In contrast, the blind valley of Norvaux and the blind valley of Valbois exhibit typical morphologies of Jura reculées.

==== Blind valleys of the Champagnole ====
The blind valleys of the Champagnole plateau open into the Ain valley by cutting through the Upper Jurassic limestones of the plateau. Their dimensions vary greatly depending on the type of erosion caused by the glacier of the last glaciation. While the blind valleys of Hérisson and La Frasnée extend over more than 10 km, reaching the first reliefs of the Haute-Chaîne, the blind valleys of Chalain and Clairvaux are mere cirques a few kilometers long that accentuate the sinuosity and steepness of the plateau’s western edge along the Ain valley. Six blind valleys are recorded: the blind valley of Ney, the blind valley of Balerne, the blind valley of Chalain, the blind valley of Hérisson, the blind valley of La Frasnée, and the blind valley of Clairvaux. The deposits left by the glacier facilitated the formation of many lakes in this region, known as the Pays des Lacs (Lake District). The origin of these blind valleys is primarily glacial. (Note: Bichet & Campy 2009, p. 188)

=== Fold belts ===
==== External fold belts ====
===== Avant-Monts =====
The Avant-Monts fold belt is a highly fractured structure, 4 to 6 km wide and about 30 km long, with a general NE-SW orientation. Its highest point (605 m) is located at Fort de Chailluz in the Chailluz forest. The fold belt overlaps the Ognon synclinal depression to the northwest, while its complexity diminishes toward the southeast near the Besançon plateau. To the south, its overthrust nature weakens considerably, whereas in the north, it presents a prominent relief formed by an overturned anticline, with its reversed limb dominating the Ognon valley. In the southern section, Lias formations dominate, the relief has been eroded, and small anticlines with Triassic cores pierce through the overlying layers. (Note: Bichet & Campy 2009, p. 210)

===== Alsatian Jura =====
The Alsatian Jura is a natural region located at the northernmost end of the Jura Massif, in the southern part of Alsace, bordering Switzerland.

==== Fold Belts of the Western edge ====
===== Lomont =====
The Lomont range runs east-west and is located in the northern part of the Doubs region, in a hilly and forested area. It marks the northern boundary of the folded Jura.

===== Bisontin fold belt =====
The Bisontin fold belt extends from Baume-les-Dames to Aveney and is continued to the northeast by the Lomont fold belt. It forms the first reliefs of the massif at the edge of the Saône-Bouclans plateau. The most characteristic geological structures are found in the Besançon region, from which the fold belt takes its name. Narrow (less than 4 km wide) and oriented NE-SW, it reaches elevations of around 600 m. It consists of two synclines and two anticlines. The Mercureaux anticline is the major fold, with the highest points of the structure. It is highly eroded in its southern part, creating a long axial valley. To the northwest, it overthrusts the Chapelle-des-Buis syncline. The fold belt is bounded to the west by the Citadelle anticline, which has been cut multiple times by the Doubs River as it progressively carved into the landscape. The cliffs of the Citadelle promontory consist of Bathonian and Upper Bajocian limestones at the base. East of the Citadelle, the promontory forms a depression due to the erosion of Oxfordian marls. This anticline disappears toward the northern part of the fold belt. The inverse and thrust faults of the fold belt are oriented westward, indicating the direction of the compression that formed it. (Note: Bichet & Campy 2009, pp. 192–193)

===== Quingey fold belt =====
Oriented north-south, the Quingey Fold is located between the Lédonien Fold and the Bisontin Fold. It is characterized by large synclinal basins carved into the marl limestones of the Upper Jurassic, alternating with narrow anticlines composed of Middle Jurassic limestones. It is bordered by the Saône-Bouclans Plateau to the east and the Quaternary deposits of the Chaux Forest to the west. The Loue River crosses the fold, following the synclines up to Rennes-sur-Loue; beyond that point, the Loue turns westward and cuts through the external anticlines of the fold, forming gorges. The anticlines of the fold consist of a western crest made of Upper Jurassic limestones, an eastern crest made of marl limestones from the Middle Jurassic, and a lateral valley of the Argovian separating the two crests. (Note: Bichet & Campy 2009, pp. 194–195)

===== Lédonien fold =====
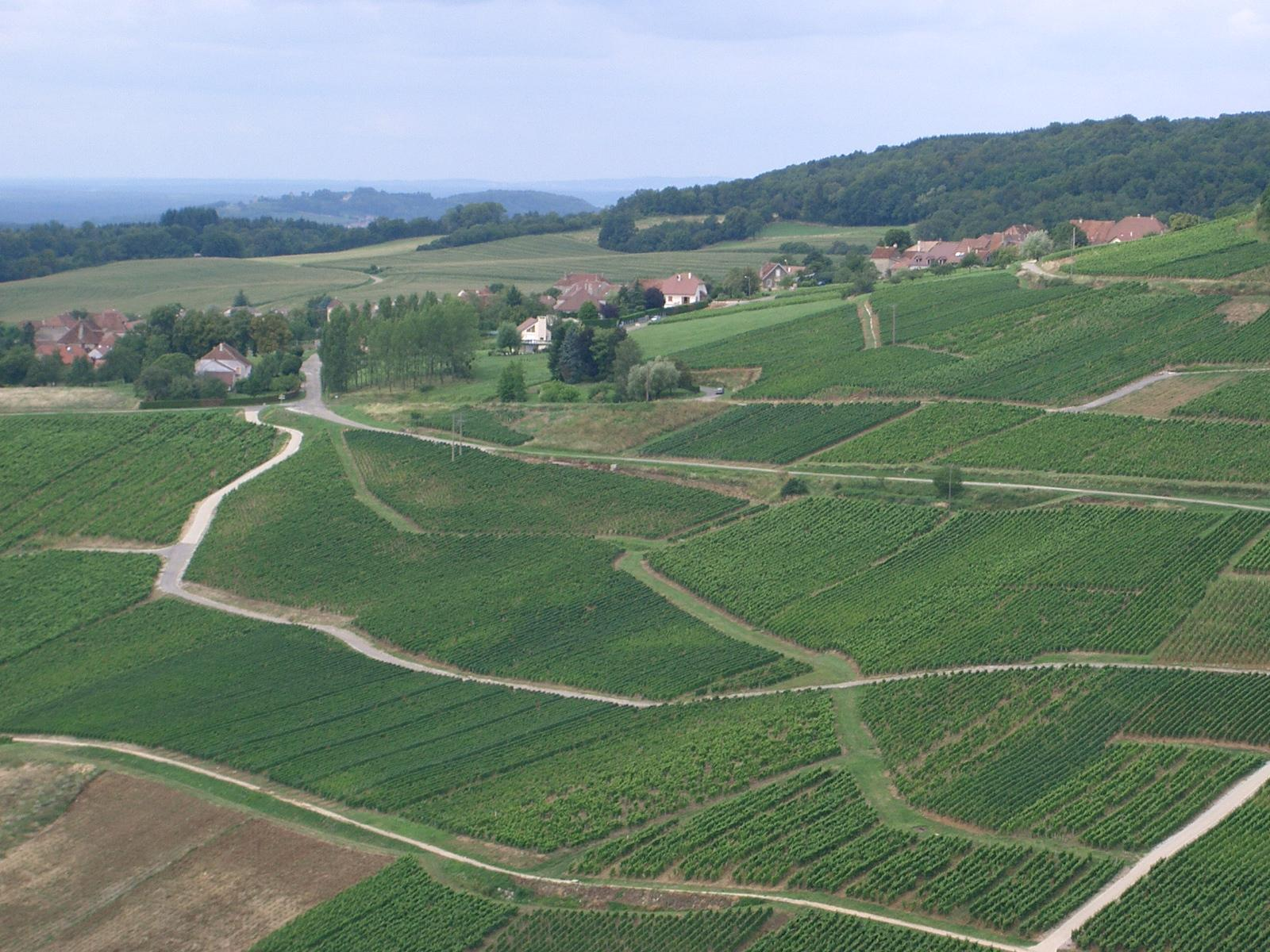
Seen from Château-Chalon, Bresse is visible in the background.

The Lédonien Fold is a transitional topographic zone, varying in width from 5 to 7 km, between the Bresse Plain to the west and the Lédonien Plateau to the east, with a north-south orientation. The relatively low relief of the fold is characterized by a series of elongated limestone ridges separated by marl depressions. This structure resulted from the Jura thrusting over the Bresse, which caused the Lédonien Plateau to advance several kilometers over the plain. To the east of the fold are the wooded limestone cliffs of the plateau (at about 550 m altitude) and its blind valleys. To the west lies the flat and monotonous terrain of the Bresse (at 210–240 m altitude). The fold appears between these structures as a domain of elongated hills parallel to the edge of the plateau, with altitudes between 300 and 400 m, rising about a hundred meters above the surrounding depressions. The altitude of the fold decreases in the alluvial plains of rivers that emerge from the blind valleys toward the Bresse. The fold is home to the Jura vineyards and has a high population density. During the Alpine compression, the outer edge of the plateau slid over the Bresse Graben via a detachment surface. During the thrusting, the displaced mass fractured into numerous compartments separated by faults. The hills are composed of limestone from the plateau, which resisted erosion better than the underlying marls that form the depressions of the fold. (Note: Bichet & Campy 2009, p. 196)

===== Petite Montagne =====
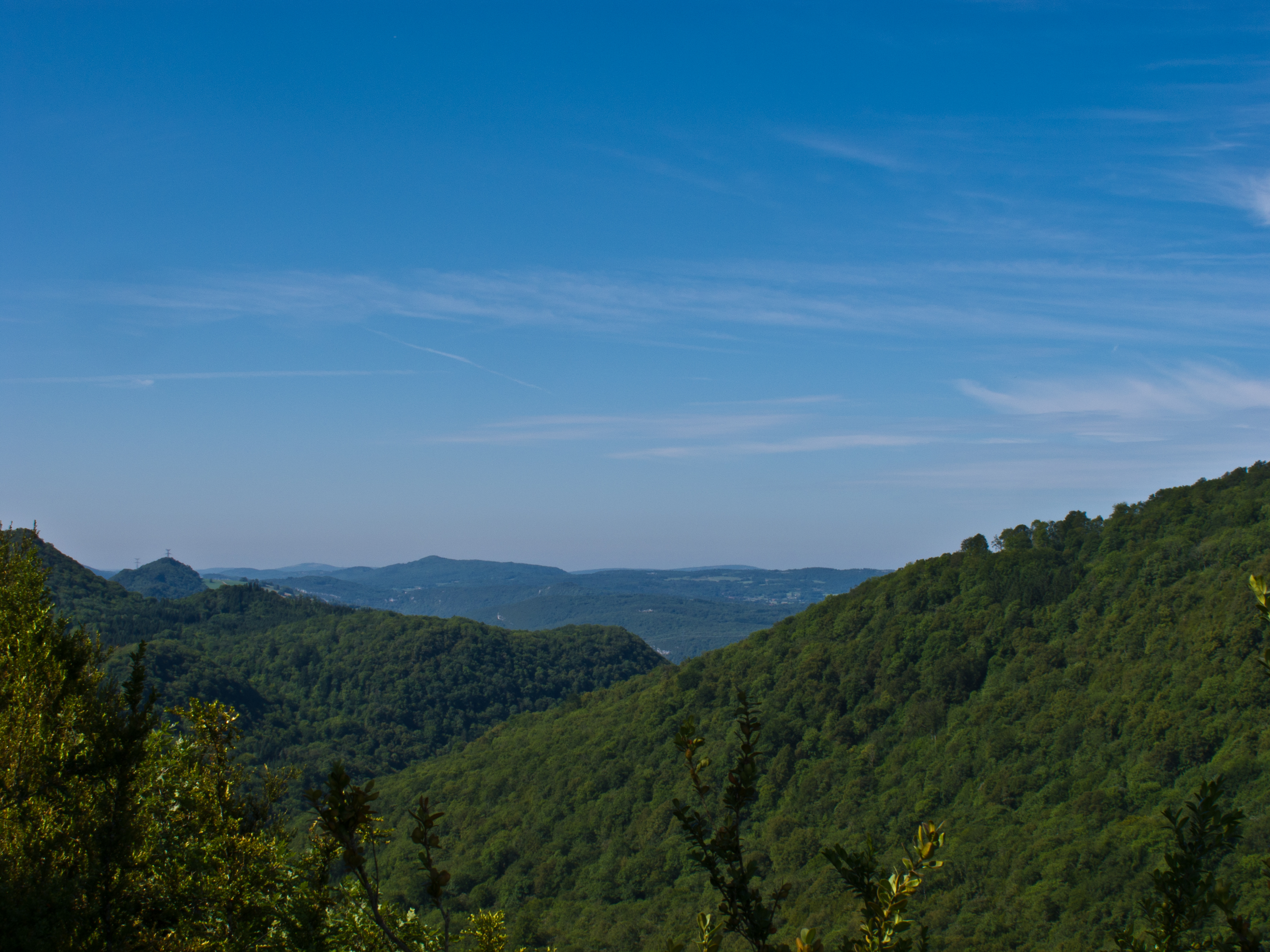
The Petite Montagne, seen from the Molard de la Justice, Jura, France.

The Petite Montagne is a group of three folds associated with two narrow bands of rolling plateaus. With a north-south orientation, it is located between the Bresse Plain to the west and the Ain River to the east, at the foot of the High Chain. The fold sectors consist of north-south undulating topography: the anticlinal folds peak at altitudes between 600 and 800 m, while the synclinal troughs range between 300 and 400 m. The sedimentary cover of the Petite Montagne underwent significant horizontal stress from the east during the Alpine push, causing detachment, displacement, and deformation of the cover, which varies by zone. In the east, the thick Middle Jurassic limestone layer of the Ain Plateau (a terminal extension of the Champagnole Plateau) remained intact, transmitting the push without deforming (like the Molasse Basin between the Alps and Jura). In the north of the fold, the terrain folded irregularly, while in the Revermont, rock formations became densely faulted and complex. The rigid Middle Jurassic limestones of the fold fractured along faults and folded, whereas the marls in the lower stratigraphic series behaved like a viscous mass, forming domes under the anticlines and stretching beneath the synclines. The marls detached from the ancient bedrock, facilitating sediment displacement and thrusting over the Bresse. Further south (in the Arinthod region), Upper Jurassic and Cretaceous outcrops are better preserved in the synclines. The limestone series is thicker than in the north and less deformed, with fewer faults. The Revermont appears as a tilted anticline thrust over the Bresse. (Note: Bichet & Campy 2009, pp. 198–199)

The anticlines of the Petite Montagne are arranged similarly to those of the Quingey Fold (crests to the east and west, separated by a central valley). The valley is formed in Lias marls, while the crests are composed of more resistant Middle Jurassic limestones. The synclines contain Oxfordian marls that retain alteration clays. (Note: Bichet & Campy 2009, p. 201)

===== Ambérieu fold =====
The Ambérieu Fold consists of a folded mountainous relief, partially karstified, extending as the southern prolongation of the Jura Massif. The limestone rocks of Bugey date from the Jurassic for the anticlines and the Cretaceous for the synclines. The folds are well-exposed in outcrops and cliffs.

==== Internal folds ====
===== Salinois fold =====
The Salinois Fold results from the thrusting of the Levier-Nozeroy Plateau over the Ornans-Valdahon Plateau and the Quingey Fold. With an altitude ranging from 730 to 970 m, the fold is about 5 km wide and 40 km long, oriented SW-NE. To the north, the thrust front marks the boundary between the fold and the Ornans-Valdahon Plateau, which it overlooks by more than 200 m. Erosion has created significant topographic relief within the fold, particularly where rivers (Loue, Lison, Furieuse) have carved deep canyons through it. At the thrust fault, the Levier Plateau unit overrides the Ornans Plateau unit. The Levier Plateau mass (300–400 m thick) moved several kilometers northwestward during the Alpine compression, aided by the plasticity of Lias marls. During the thrusting, the terrain folded and fractured, with Lias marls from the Levier Plateau overriding Jurassic limestones from the Ornans Plateau. (Note: Bichet & Campy 2009, pp. 202–203)

===== Heute fold =====
The Heute Fold-Fault is a faulted structure approximately 40 kilometers long and a few kilometers wide, oriented southwest-northeast, with an elevation ranging between 650 and 780 meters. It represents a geological and topographic break between the Lédonien Plateau (to the west) and the Champagnole Plateau (to the east). The structure of the fold-fault is highly varied, and three distinct zones can be identified: the northern zone (a subsidence graben marked by a depression), the central zone (a compressed subsidence graben marked by either a depression or relief), and the southern zone (a deformed structure creating significant relief). The fold-fault lies between the Lédonien Plateau and the eroded Champagnole Plateau (Ain Valley). The name "Côte de l’Heute" applies to the southern zone and part of the central zone, and it is from this relief that the fold-fault derives its name. The exposed core of the fold consists of Upper Jurassic limestones, while Middle Jurassic limestones outcrop along the edges of the plateaus. In the southern zone, the relief is created by one or two thrust faults. The fault network of the fold-fault is highly complex; two coupled faults form its spine and determine its orientation. Transverse faults across the fold-fault have facilitated its erosion and localized subsidence. (Note: Bichet & Campy 2009, pp. 206–207)

===== Syam fold =====
The Syam Fold separates the Champagnole Plateau (west) from the Levier-Nozeroy Plateau (east). Approximately 15 kilometers long and about 3 kilometers wide, with a north-south orientation, it is characterized by a distinct relief with a depression situated between two plateaus. The fold disappears into the Nans Valley, between the Fraisse Forest and the Joux Forest. Originally, it was a complex anticline formed by the accumulation of Triassic salt-rich marls within the fold; today, this anticline is completely eroded. This marl extrusion occurred beneath the thrust fault of the fold. This thrusting caused the Upper Jurassic limestone cover to slide westward over this marl uplift, creating a 200-meter elevation difference between the Nozeroy Plateau and the fold. Erosion then completely dispersed the marls of the fold, revealing the depression. (Note: Bichet & Campy 2009, pp. 208–209)

===== Mamirolle fold-fault =====
The Mamirolle fold-fault is a faulted band that initially exhibits, between Alaise and Cléron to the southwest, the characteristics of a tectonic graben, then transitions into a ramp where the Middle Jurassic limestone of L'Hôpital-du-Grosbois thrusts northwestward over the Upper Jurassic limestone of Mamirolle. Finally, it becomes a zone of en échelon strike-slip faults between Verrières-du-Grosbois and Baume-les-Dames.

The fold-fault divides the Ornans Plateau into two parts: to the northeast, the Saône-Champlive sub-plateau, and to the southwest, the Ornans-Vercel-Sancey sub-plateau.

=== Structures and landscapes of the Haute-Chaîne ===
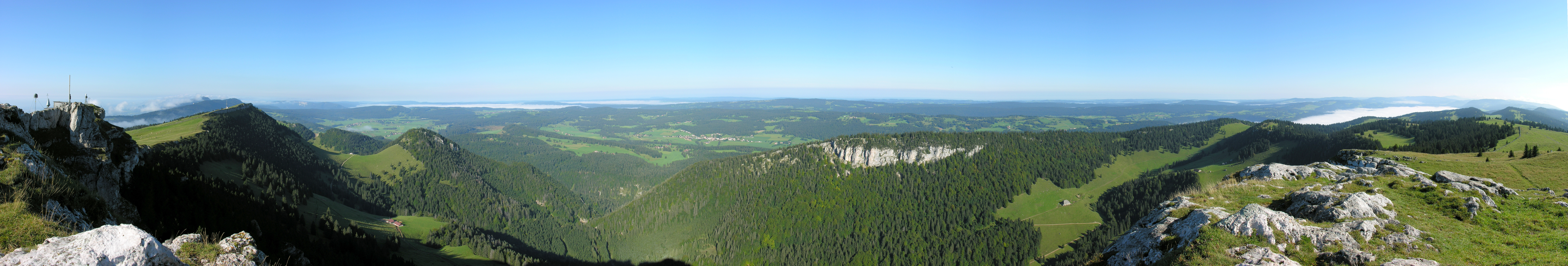
Haute-Chaîne landscape (view from Chasseron).

==== Folds ====
===== Morphology =====
The Haute-Chaîne, a folded zone, is characterized by the presence of distinctive "box folds," which are typical of Jura folding. These folds have nearly vertical flanks and a sub-horizontal crest in the case of anticlines or a sub-horizontal floor in the case of synclines. (Note: Foucault & Raoult 2010, p. 277) Two types of folds have been identified in the massif: folds associated with evaporites, located in the molassic basin and the outer Jura plateaus (fold belts and fold-fault structures), and thrust-related folds found within the Haute-Chaîne. These two types of folds demonstrate that the upper Triassic layers played a role in the development of the thrust structures within the sedimentary cover and influenced their formation.

==== Cluses ====
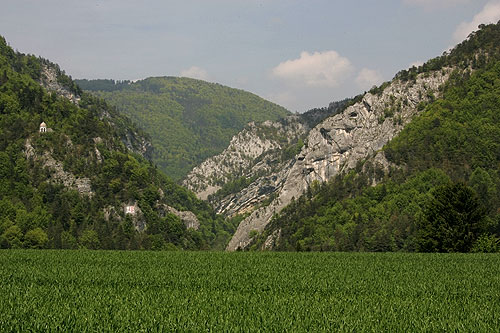
Moutier Lake in the canton of Bern in Switzerland.

Cluses are deeply incised valleys that run perpendicular to the folds they cut through. Generally, cluses carve through an anticline, though more complex ones cut across multiple folds, such as the cluses in the southern part of the massif (e.g., the Cluse de Nantua, Cluse des Hôpitaux). The origin of cluses is still debated, but many geologists agree that they result from the downcutting of pre-existing rivers that were already present before the formation of the Jura massif. As the anticlines folded and uplifted, these rivers progressively eroded through the folds. Cluses are found throughout the folded Jura (Haute-Chaîne and fold belts), either isolated or forming networks of aligned cluses. In the latter case, they follow north-south faults that intersect the folds obliquely. They are typically traversed by a watercourse, but some are dry, in which case they are referred to as "dry cluses." Due to their natural passageways through the Jura massif, cluses are often used as key routes for transportation.

==== Combes ====
A combe forms at the crest of an anticline bulge. In this location, the folding process facilitates erosion by stretching and then fracturing the limestone layers. Initially, erosion creates localized depressions in the anticline crest, forming karstic features such as dolines. The folding process stretches the layers, forming fissures that widen through erosion, particularly due to rainwater and frost. Over time, these depressions expand and merge, creating a more extensive, chaotic relief, solidifying the combe at the top of the anticline. Eventually, it is flanked on both sides by ridges as it reaches the marl layers of the anticline. The dissolution of rock by erosion is further amplified by physical processes such as disintegration and landslides, particularly during the glacial periods of the Quaternary.

==== Tectonic faults ====
===== Strike-Slip faults =====
In about ten locations throughout the massif, between the two extremities of the Haute-Chaîne, folds have been cut by large faults that caused strike-slip displacements. These faults are oriented NW-SE in the southern part of the massif, NNW-SSE to N-S in the central Jura, and NNE-SSW in the eastern Jura. The main observed strike-slip faults affect the Mesozoic cover but do not extend into the basement rock on either side of the fault. Currently, no evidence supports the idea that these faults continue into the basement.

One of the most striking strike-slip faults is the Pontarlier Fault, which cuts through the entire Haute-Chaîne from north of Lausanne to the Ornans-Valdahon plateau. This fault is visible in the landscape as a long, linear depression resulting from the erosion of fractured terrain.

The offset varies along its length, reaching nearly 9 km south of Pontarlier. This fault influences water drainage: the Doubs River follows the fault, which allows the river’s waters to seep deep underground toward the Loue River, as the fault disrupts the continuity of the impermeable Lias marls. The juxtaposition of anticlines and synclines forces the Doubs to follow the fault for several kilometers in the Pontarlier area before resuming its northeastward course. A clear asymmetry is visible on geological maps of the region, and the number of folds differs on either side of the fault, confirming that it predates the folding of the Jura. (Note: Bichet & Campy 2009, pp. 234–235) This strike-slip fault also contributed to the formation of the Mont d'Or cliff, which is located 1.2 km further west. It is estimated that the vertical rock face has retreated by the same amount over the past 5 to 6 million years, corresponding to a retreat rate of 2 to 3 cm per century.

===== Thrust faults =====
Some anticlines in the Haute-Chaîne thrust over the synclines associated with them, creating faulted relief within the syncline. The Dent de Vaulion is a remnant of an eroded anticline, overturned westward, which thrusts over the terminus of the Joux syncline. This syncline disappears underground beneath the Dent de Vaulion, exposing Middle Jurassic limestones. A sliver of Cretaceous rock at the thrust front highlights the region’s complex tectonics. (Note: Bichet & Campy 2009, p. 240)

At the Planches-en-Montagne anticline, at the boundary with the Levier-Nozeroy plateau, east-west compression has disrupted the anticline, creating internal thrusts that insert a sliver of Bajocian and Bathonian limestone between the two lateral ridges. (Note: Bichet & Campy 2009, p. 244)

Along the western edge of the Haute-Chaîne, the Pic de l'Aigle was formed by the thrusting of Haute-Chaîne geological units over those of the Champagnole plateau. Three successive thrusts are observed here, progressively exposing, from east to west, Bathonian limestones, Upper Jurassic limestones at the peak, and Cretaceous limestones in the syncline below. (Note: Bichet & Campy 2009, p. 246)

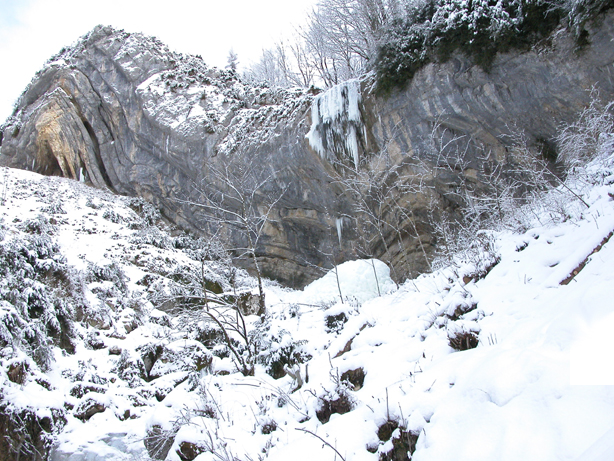
Gendarme's hat.

Thrust faults sometimes produce small "disharmonic" folds, such as the Chapeau de Gendarme near Septmoncel. This fold results from the detachment of Cretaceous limestones on the flank of the Grès anticline (west). During the thrusting of the Molunes anticline (east) over the Grès anticline, the Cretaceous rocks atop the Grès anticline detached from the underlying Upper Jurassic limestones due to the presence of soft Berriasian marls intercalated between the limestone layers. The thinly bedded nature of the limestone and the presence of marl layers facilitated intense deformation, causing the Cretaceous limestones to fold. (Note: Bichet & Campy 2009, p. 250) Near the Chapeau de Gendarme, another major thrust fault appears: the Saint-Claude Thrust Fault. Here, the Tressus Anticline, northeast of Saint-Claude, thrusts over a synclinal structure. The leading edge of the thrust consists of a Cretaceous slice exposed at the base of Mont Bayard. (Note: Bichet & Campy 2009, p. 252)

== Natural resources ==
=== Asphalt ===
Several asphalt deposits have been identified within the Yellow Limestone Member of Neuchâtel and the formations of the Orbe and Vallorbe gorges (Lower Cretaceous), which act as reservoir rocks.

The most significant deposit was discovered in 1711 by Eirini d’Eyrinis, a Greek scholar, in the Val-de-Travers syncline (folded Jura). However, asphalt impregnations had been known since at least 1626, when they were referred to as "pitch earth" (Hartz-Erde). The main deposit is con centrated in the upper part of the Urgonian limestones (Vallorbe Formation) on the southern flank of the syncline. It is distributed across several impregnated layers, with the “Bon Blanc” and “Petite Couche” horizons being the most economically valuable. However, their southeastern extension is interrupted by the main thrust fault of the Soliat-Creux-du-Van anticline, which brings Kimmeridgian limestones from the anticline into contact with the molasse of the Val-de-Travers syncline.

The exploitation of asphalt began in the summer of 1713, after the site's concession was granted in 1712 by King Frederick I of Prussia, under whose rule the Principality of Neuchâtel then fell. Initially, extraction took place in open-pit mines on the left bank of the Areuse near Bois de Croix until 1840, then shifted to the right bank once the deposit on the left was depleted. The Presta mine began operations around 1869, with more than 100 km of galleries being excavated. At its peak in 1913, it produced over 53,000 tons of raw asphalt, making it the largest asphalt deposit in Western Europe. Production declined with the outbreak of World War I and only resumed after World War II. Extraction ceased in October 1986, and the Presta mine was officially closed on December 31, 1987. Since then, it has been open to the public.

Asphalt-Impregnated Layers in the Val-de-Travers
Age	Lithology	Mining Terms	Average Thickness	Impregnation	Content
Middle Aptian	Marls and marly limestones	Marls	nd	nd	nd
Hauterivian - Barremian	Asphaltic limestone	Petit Banc or Petite Couche	0.6 - 0.8 m	Regular	4 - 5%
Hauterivian - Barremian	Chalky limestone "Banc à Caprotines"	Crappe or Roof	1.5 - 2.5 m	Irregular or barren	0 - 3%
Hauterivian - Barremian	Sandstone asphaltic limestone	False Roof	0.5 m	Regular	5 - 7%
Hauterivian - Barremian	Asphaltic limestone	Bon Banc	4 – 5 m	Regular	8 - 12%
Hauterivian - Barremian	Sandstone asphaltic limestone	Lower Crappe	Lower Crappe	Regular	5 - 7%
Hauterivian - Barremian	Oolitic and sparry limestone	Rock	nd	nd	nd

Other smaller deposits were also exploited along the western shore of Lake Neuchâtel, particularly at Saint-Aubin and Sauges. The Saint-Aubin deposit contained three impregnated layers that were mined for about ten years in the 19th century for the manufacture of bitumen-coated cardboard pipes and asphalt mastic. The impregnated Urgonian limestone takes on a gray hue and was quarried at the Gigy quarry in Bevaix as a building stone. Asphalt impregnations have also been reported between Auvernier and Serrières. Further south, deposits have been identified in an area extending from the southernmost Jura (Chézery) to the banks of the Rhône north of Seyssel (Pyrimont and Challonges) and the Fier gorges (Lovagny and Chavanod).

In addition to Urgonian limestones, asphalt has also been found in the red molasse (Lower Freshwater Molasse) around Geneva (Dardagny) and south of Lake Neuchâtel (Chavornay and Orbe).

=== Iron ===
Due to their high iron content, siderolithic sandstones have been extensively mined. On the Salève, these sandstones were locally exploited between the 5th and 13th centuries at the Rochers de Faverges for the production of iron and steel. Later, in the 19th and 20th centuries, mines were excavated in the Delémont Basin, though they failed to yield sufficient output. Additionally, paleocavities were exploited on the Grand-Ratz plateau.

== See also ==
- Jura Mountains
- Jurassic
- Geology of the Alps

== Bibliography ==
- Bichet, Vincent; Campy, Michel (2009). Montagnes du Jura: Géologie et paysages [Jura Mountains: Geology and landscapes] (in French) (2nd ed.). Besançon: Néo Éditions. ISBN 978-2-9147-4161-3.
- Campy, Michel (2017). Terroirs viticoles du Jura, géologie et paysages [Wine-growing regions of the Jura, geology and landscapes] (in French). Éditions Mêta-Jura. ISBN 978-2-9535125-9-5. Archived from the original on April 16, 2019.
- Foucault, Alain; Raoult, Jean-François (2010). Dictionnaire de géologie [Dictionary of Geology] (in French) (7th ed.). Paris: Dunod. ISBN 978-2-10-054778-4.
- Jouanne, François (1994). Mesure de la déformation actuelle des Alpes occidentales et du Jura par comparaison de données géodésiques historiques [Measurement of the current deformation of the Western Alps and the Jura by comparison of historical geodetic data] (PDF) (in French). Grenoble: Joseph Fourier University. ISSN 0993-796X. Archived from the original (PDF) on January 26, 2013.
- Lienhardt, Georges (1962). Géologie du bassin houiller stéphanien du Jura et de ses morts-terrains [Geology of the Jurassic Stephenian coal basin and its overburden]. Mémoires du BRGM (in French). Éditions Technip Chambéry.
- Neyroud, Michel (1984). "Un haut plateau jurassien: le plateau des Molunes (Jura). Macroformes karstiques et structures anticlinales" [A high plateau in the Jura: the Molunes plateau (Jura). Karstic macroforms and anticlinal structures]. Karstologia: Revue de karstologie et de spéléologie physique (in French). 3 (1). Paris: 46–51. doi:10.3406/karst.1984.2069. ISSN 0751-7688.
- Sommaruga, Anna (2000). Géologie du Jura central et du bassin molassique: nouveaux aspects d'une chaîne d'avant-pays plissée et décollée sur des couches d'évaporites. Neuchâtel: Société neuchâteloise des Sciences naturelles. ISBN 2-88347-001-4. Archived from the original on February 8, 2022.
- Thurmann, Jules (1832). Essai sur les soulèvemens jurassiques du Porrentruy: description géognostique de la série jurassique et théorie orographique du soulèvement [Essay on the Jurassic uplifts of the Porrentruy: geognostic description of the Jurassic series and orographic theory of the uplift] (in French). Paris, Brussels: F.G. Levrault & Librairie parisienne.
