= Salt deformation =

Change of shape of geological salt bodies submitted to stress

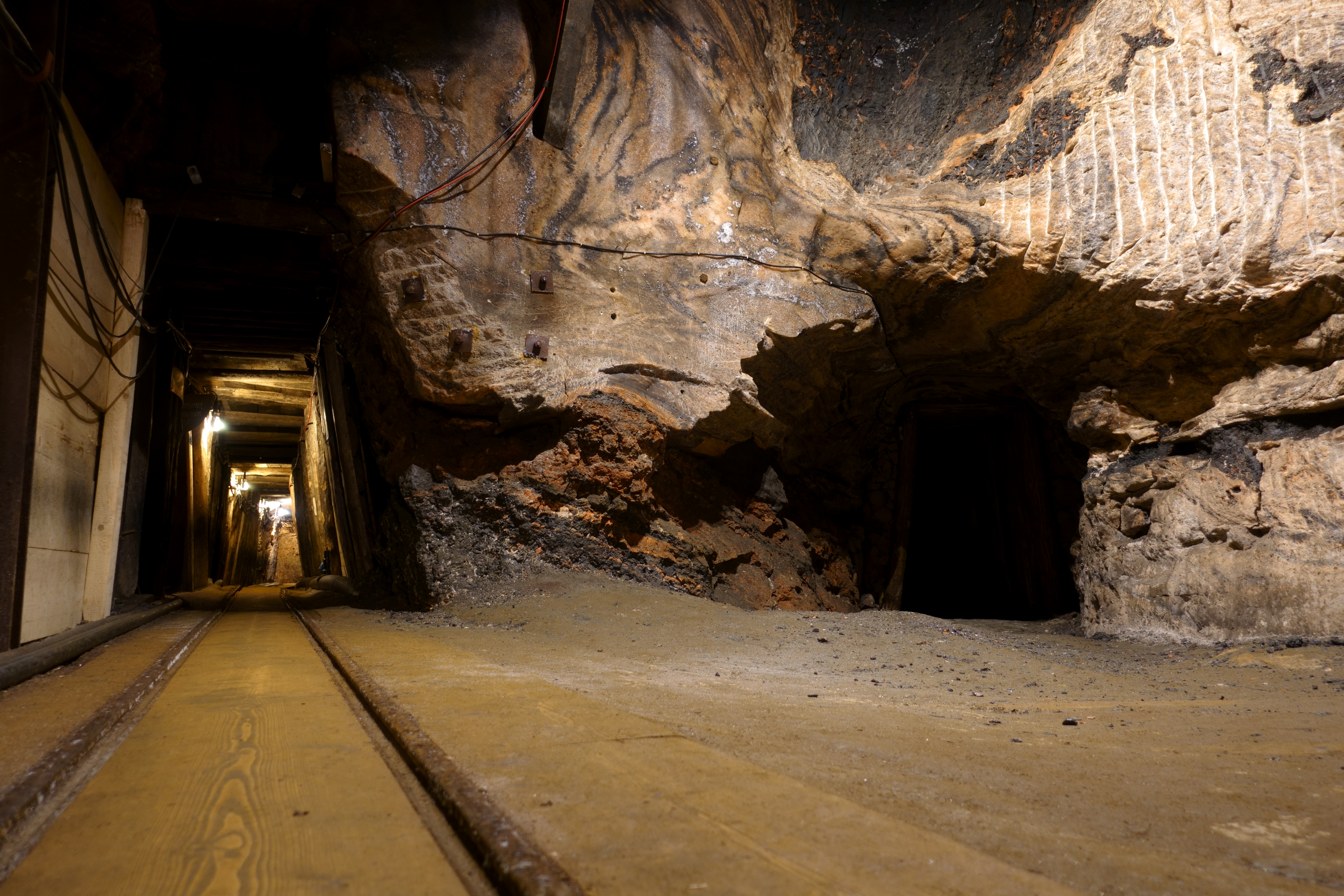
Adits in deformed rock salt. Salt mine of Altaussee, Austria

Salt deformation is the change of shape of natural salt bodies in response to forces and mechanisms that controls salt flow. Such deformation can generate large salt structures such as underground salt layers, salt diapirs or salt sheets at the surface. Strictly speaking, salt structures are formed by rock salt that is composed of pure halite (NaCl) crystal. However, most halite in nature appears in impure form, therefore rock salt usually refers to all rocks that composed mainly of halite, sometimes also as a mixture with other evaporites such as gypsum and anhydrite. Earth's salt deformation generally involves such mixed materials.

Due to the unique physical and chemical properties of rock salt such as its low density, high thermal conductivity and high solubility in water, it deforms distinctively in underground and surface environments compared with other rocks. Instability of rock salt is also given by its low viscosity, which allows rock salt to flow as a fluid. As the rock salt flows, a variety of salt structures are formed. Therefore, basins containing salt deform more easily than those lacking salt.

== Physical properties of rock salt ==
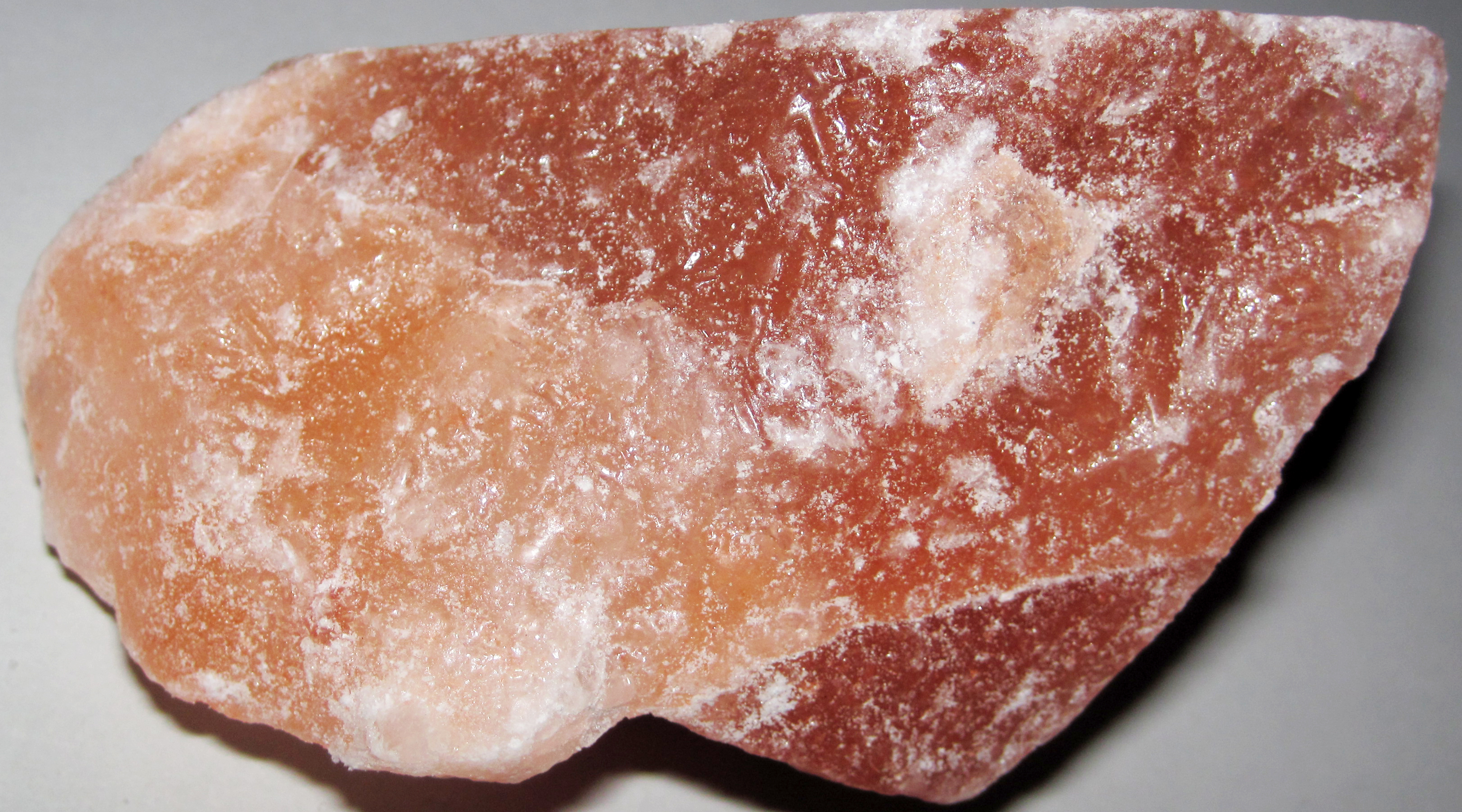
Rock salt from Pakistan's Khewra Salt Mine. Rock salt from this salt mine is composed of 99% pure halite. The pink colour comes from the trace amounts of iron.

=== Density and buoyancy ===
Rock salt has an effective porosity of nearly 50% on the surface, while the effective porosity decreases to less than 10% at a depth of 10 m. When the burial depth reaches about 45 m, the pore spaces are completely filled. After rock salt losses its porosity, it becomes almost incompressible and keeps a constant density of 2.2 g/cm^{3} as the depth continue to increase.

When rock salt reaches a depth of 6–8 km, other rocks are metamorphosed into greenschist. At such burial depths, the density of rock salt is slightly decreased as a result of thermal expansion. However, unlike rock salt, as the burial depth increases, shale and most other sedimentary rocks decrease in porosity and increase in density progressively. In the first 1000 m of burial depth, rock salt has a higher density compared with other rocks such as shale. When the buried material reaches a critical depth of 1.2-1.3 km, the density of rock salt and other rocks are roughly the same, where neutral buoyancy is reached. Starting from 1.3-1.5 km below the surface, the density of other rocks exceeds that of rock salt, density inversion takes place, meaning that salt has positive buoyancy when buried under other rocks at around 1.3 km. At this depth, salt rises and intrudes into the overburden, forming a diapir.

=== Thermal conductivity and expansivity ===
Rock salt is characterized by its high thermal conductivity. For example, at 43 °C, it has a thermal conductivity of 5.13 W/(m⋅K), while shale only has a thermal conductivity of 1.76 W/(m⋅K) at the same temperature.

The volume of rock salt can be largely affected by thermal gradient. When rock salt is buried underground at 5 km at a thermal gradient of 30 °C/km, its volume expands by 2% due to thermal expansion, while pressurization only causes volume reduction of 0.5%. Therefore, the larger the burial depth of rock salt, the lower the density of it, which in turns favors the positive buoyancy induced by density inversion.

Heat can also lead to the internal flow of rock salt. When the burial depth of rock salt is over 2.9 km at a thermal gradient of 30 °C/km with viscosity below 10^{16} Pa.s, a flow of rock salt by thermal conduction occurs. However thermal conduction is not the dominant mechanism of salt flow in a sedimentary basin, which is completely different from the flow of magma. Salt flows at the surface if it is sufficiently wet, for instance, the flow of salt glaciers, which is an exposed structure formed when a salt diapir pierces through its overburden.

=== Viscosity ===
Viscosity is a measure of the resistance of fluids to flow that can be represented by the ratio of shear stress to shear strain. High viscosity means a high resistance to flow and vice versa. Experimental results show that rock salt has a higher viscosity compare with bittern and rhyolite lava, but lower viscosity than mud rock, shale, and mantle. Besides, the viscosity of rock salt is closely related to the water content. The more the water content in rock salt, the lower its viscosity.

When salt glaciers feed from diapir is exposed at the surface and is infiltrated by meteoric water, the viscosity of rock salt is reduced. Consequently, the flow rate of salt glaciers is much faster than that of salt tongue spreading and salt diapir rise.

In general, fine-grained wet salt flows as a Newtonian fluid, unlike coarse-grained salt. Otherwise, it will spread due to gravitational force as it extrudes to the surface.

=== Strength ===
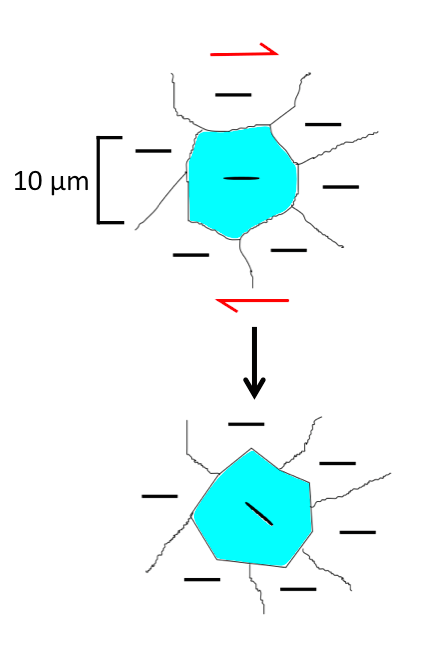
Figure showing the central blue subgrain before rotation recrystallisation (upper part) and after rotation recrystallisation (lower part). The central subgrain is re-orientated. The central black line in each subgrain indicates their orientations. An angle difference in crystal lattice between the central grain and the surrounding grains is created during this process.

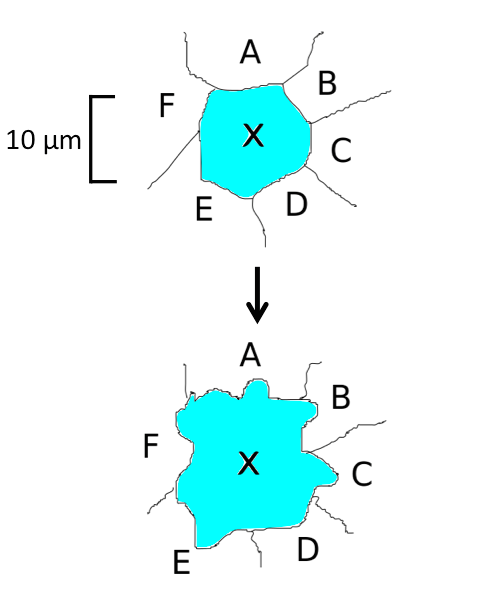
Figure showing grain boundary migration. The central crystal X has a lower dislocation density then the surrounding crystal A-F. When the surrounding grains are re-orientated to match the crystal lattice of crystal X, this results in moving of grain boundary.

When stress is applied, rock salt behaves like a fluid, while other rocks of higher strength are brittle under such conditions. When comparing the tensional and compressional strength of wet salt and dry salt with other typical rocks at a strain rate of 10^{−14}s^{−1}, such as shale and quartzite, both wet and dry salt shows lower strength than the other rocks. Wet salt is even weaker than dry salt: when the water content of rock salt exceeds 0.01%, the rock salt behaves as weak crystalline fluid. Therefore, wet salt deforms more easily compare with dry salt.

== Salt deformation mechanism ==
=== Subgrain rotation recrystallization ===
Subgrain rotation recrystallization involves formation of new grain boundary as the subgrain rotates gradually and forms an angle between the surrounding crystals. A new crystal is created from mis-orientation of a subgrain. The process is dominant in the top and middle part of a salt glacier.

=== Grain-boundary migration ===
Grain-boundary migration is a dominant deformation mechanism at the top and the middle part of the salt glacier. A subgrain is re-orientated to match the crystal lattice of the adjacent subgrain. Grain boundaries will move as the surrounding crystals are gradually consumed.

=== Pressure-solution ===
Pressure-solution involves dissolution of crystals, it becomes the main deformation mechanism when salt is wetted. This process are usually observed at distal part of a salt glacier.

== Salt dynamics ==
=== Underground salt structure ===
A subsurface salt layer or a salt diapir that has not extruded the surface is considered as an underground salt structure. Buoyancy, gravitational differential loading and tectonic stress are the three main types of force that can drive salt flow. However, salt flow can be restricted by strength of overlaying sediments and boundary friction within the salt layer.

==== Buoyancy ====
At the critical depth of 1.2–1.3 km, the density of rock salt and surrounding rocks are roughly the same. At greater burial depth, density inverts, and the rock salt become less dense than the overburden rocks, which leads to positive buoyancy of the rock salt and causes the salt to rise. As temperature increases with depth, the salt is heated and expands; this also leads to an increase in the buoyancy of the rock salt.

However, when the overburden is thick enough, the salt will not be able to pierce the overburden by buoyancy.

==== Gravitational differential loading ====
Gravitational differential loading is produced by a combination of gravitational forces acting on the overburden rocks and the underlying salt layer. The effect of gravitational loading on salt flow can simply be expressed by the concept of hydraulic head:

$h = z + \frac{P}{\rho_sg}$

Where h is the hydraulic head, z is the elevation head that counts from a datum to the top of the salt layer, P is pressure exerted on the salt layer by overburden, $\rho_s$ is the density of the salt and g is the gravity acceleration. Pressure head are expressed as P over $\rho_sg$. As P is also equal to $\rho_ot$ , where $\rho_o$ is the density of the overburden and t is its thickness.

Therefore, the equation can be rewritten as:

$h = z + \frac{\rho_o}{\rho_s}t$

Note that the pressure head P is then expressed as $\frac{\rho_o}{\rho_s}t$.

Assuming the ratio of density of the overburden rock to that of the salt layer remains unchanged in the following three cases:

Case	Thickness of overburden, t	Elevation head, z	Hydraulic head	Explanation	Diagram
1	Constant, $t_1 = t_2$	$z_1=z_2$	$h_1=h_2$	When the thickness and the elevation head are constant, although the thickness of the salt layer is not uniform, there is no salt flow, due to the zero hydraulic gradient.	Uniform thickness of overburden and constant elevation head. Modified from Hudec & Jackson, 2007.
2	Constant, $t_1 = t_2$	$z_1>z_2$	$h_1>h_2$	The thickness of overburden still remains constant; however there is elevation head gradient, leading to h_{1} > h_{2} causing salt flow in the direction of higher to lower elevation head gradient.	Uniform thickness of overburden but with a difference in elevation head. Modified from Hudec & Jackson, 2007.
3	$t_1>t_2$	$z_1=z_2$	$h_1>h_2$	Although the surface of the salt layer has uniform elevation, the difference in thickness of overburden rock produces a pressure head gradient. Thus there will be a gradient in the hydraulic head that drives the salt to flow.	Constant elevation head with a varying thickness of the overburden. Modified from Hudec & Jackson, 2007.

==== Tectonic stress ====
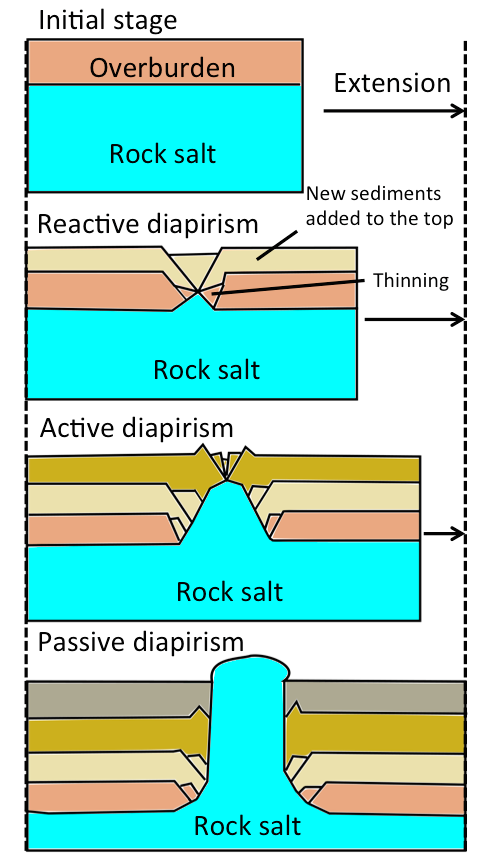
Evolutionary diagram showing diapir development during thin-skinned extension. Modified from Vendeville & Jackson, 1992.

===== Tensional stress =====
Tensional stress affects salt structure deformation by (1) forming fractures in the overlying rocks, thinning of overburden and reduction of strength of overburden, (2) developing a graben in overburden that favors gravitational differential loading. Most salt diapirs in the world were initiated during regional extension, implying that salt diapirism is primarily activated by tensional stress.

Tensional stress leads to thin-skinned extension, which stretches the overburden but not the salt layer in the base. Deformation of salt structures from thin-skinned extension can be divided into three stages. However, diapir does not need to go through all these stages, depending on the amount and rate of extension, density of overburden, etc.

1) In the initial stage, regional extension thins and weaken the overburden, salt begins to rise and fill up the space created from thinning. When regional extension stops, the rise of diapirs will also stop. This stage is called reactive diapirism, as it is reacting to the extension.

2) As the thinning and weakening continues, the deformation proceeds to the second stage, in which the overlying rock becomes weak enough for salt to pierce and to be pushed up. The phenomenon only occurs when overburden is denser than salt, probably after reaching the critical depth. This phase is termed as active diapirism, the salt still continues to rise even after regional extension stops.

3) In the third stage, the diapir pierces through the overlying rock and is exposed at the surface. This phase is called passive diapirism.

===== Compressional stress =====
With preexisting diapir structure, rock salt moves upward and is cut off from the source layer by compression. Additional sediments are deposited on top at the same time. Blue colour indicate the salt layers.

Compressional stress thickens and strengthens the overlying rock, this resists the rock salt from piercing up and slows down the formation of a diapir, except when an anticline formed from compression force is seriously eroded to great depth. In the case where there are preexisting salt diapir structures that are mechanically weaker, the diapirs are reactivated during regional compression, rock salt then moves upward and is cut off from the source layer. For another case of no preexisting rock salt diapirs, salt mainly acts as a lubricant to form décollement.

===== Shear stress =====
Shear stress does not much affect the salt layer, but salt will still flow if compressional stress and tensional stress are induced from the shear, and results in similar salt deformation behavior in the stressed zone. Deformation of salt structure can be classified into four types:

Types	Diapir	Force	Deformation of salt structure	Diagram
1	Preexisting	Localized compression	Salt displaced to the top and is cut off from the source layer.	Right lateral shear, salt layer is marked in blue
2	Preexisting	Localized extension	Widening of diapir, diapir can fall if the rate of salt supply is not enough to support the weight of the overlying rock, but will rise if there is sufficient salt supply to push up the overburden	Left lateral shear, salt layer is marked in blue
3	No preexisting	Localized compression	No diapir is formed after slip	Right lateral shear, salt layer is marked in blue
4	No preexisting	Localized extension	Trigger reactive diapirism after slip	Left lateral shear, salt layer is marked in blue

==== The strength of overlying sediments ====
As the burial depth increase, the strength of sedimentary rocks increases with the rising pressure. Therefore, most thick overburden is more difficult to pierce by underlying salt and deform accordingly. Overlying sediments that have a thickness of few hundred meters rarely deform if external forces such as compression and extension do not exist.

==== Boundary friction within the salt layer ====
Boundary friction along the top and the bottom of the salt layer restricts the ability of salt to flow. When salt shear passes the boundary between the salt layer and the surrounding rigid rocks, a drag force opposite to the direction of flow exists in the shear zone and resists salt flow. The thickness of this boundary shear zone can affect the flow rate of the salt layer. If the flow has a constant dynamic viscosity, which means it is Newtonian viscous, the boundary layer is thicker. For salt flow that is power-law viscous, such that it decreases in dynamic viscosity as the rate of shear increases towards the fluid boundary, the boundary layer is thinner.

Newtonian flow has a great impact on the flow rate of salt, which the volumetric flux is proportional to the thickness of the salt layer to the power of three, which means if the thickness of the salt layer is doubled, the volumetric flux will speed up the flow by eight times. Power-law flow has a relatively smaller effect on slowing down salt flow.

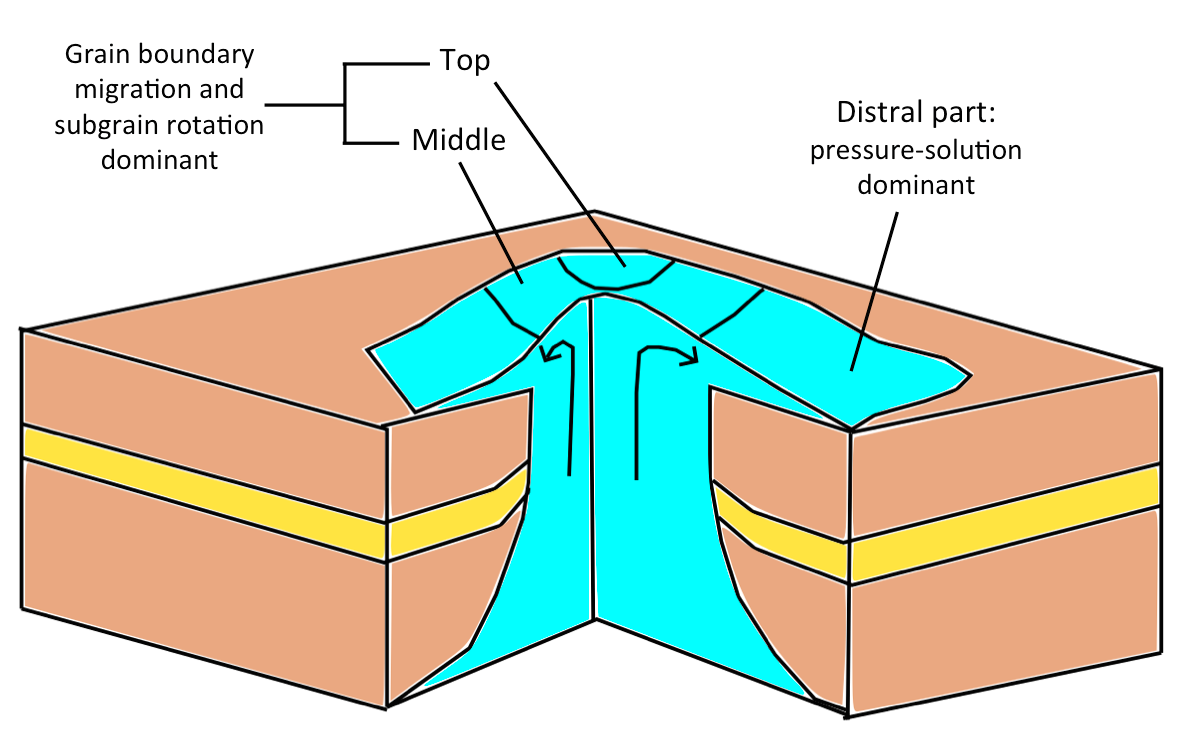
Deformation and recrystallization in different parts of a salt glacier, salt layer is marked in blue. Arrows indicate the direction of salt flow.

=== Surface salt structure ===
Surface salt structures are formed when underground salt diapirs pierce through the overlying rock.

When salt extrudes and flows at the surface, it becomes a salt glacier (also known as a salt fountain). Unlike underground salt structures, when rock salt is uncovered, it is exposed to rainwater, wind and heat from the sun that could lead to rapid deformation of salt structure within a short time, which can be daily to seasonal.

==== Uplift of salt glaciers ====
When an underground salt diapir rises and extrudes at the surface, it pushes up the overlaying rock and results in an uplift movement of the salt glacier together with the overlying rock. Uplift movements in the rate of mm/yr are observed in various locations such as Mount Sedom in Israel and the salt glaciers in Iran.

Salt diapirs that are exposed at the surface rise faster than the diapirs that remain in the subsurface, as the strength of overlying sediments is decreased.

==== Deformation by precipitation ====
Different parts of a salt glacier deform with different mechanisms. A microstructural study shows that as salt flows from the summit of the salt fountain to the distal part, pressure solution becomes the dominant process as a result of infiltrated rainwater and decreased grain size, instead of subgrain rotation recrystallization and grain boundary migration which are dominant in the top and the middle part of the salt fountain. In other words, it has been suggested that the infiltration of rainwater into rock salt will cause deformation at the grain-size level.

Plastic flow of salt glaciers during rainy seasons and individual storm events and shrinkage after drying of the glacier were observed in Jashak salt dome (also known as Dashti salt dome or Kuh-e-Namak), Iran, suggesting seasonal movements in salt glaciers in response to weather condition. However, another study in the Kuqa fold-thrust belt tried to test the seasonal responsiveness of glacier movement regarding rainfall, but did not observe the correlation between salt deformation and precipitation, and stated their result may be attributed to limited satellite and ground observation data.

Further investigations, by using remote sensing technique and especially performing field observations are needed to confirm the relationship.

==== Deformation by temperature change ====
Other than crystallization and hydration, thermal expansion is one of the most frequently mentioned mechanisms in salt weathering. Rock salt expands when heated. It is known that most salt weathering occur in regions with arid climates. Due to the high thermal conductivity of salt glaciers, heat can be transmitted hundreds of meters through dry salt in a few minutes.

== See also ==
- Diapirism
- Rock salt (halite)
- Salt surface structures
- Salt glacier
- Salt tectonics
