= Fold mountains =

Mountains formed by compressive crumpling of the layers of rock

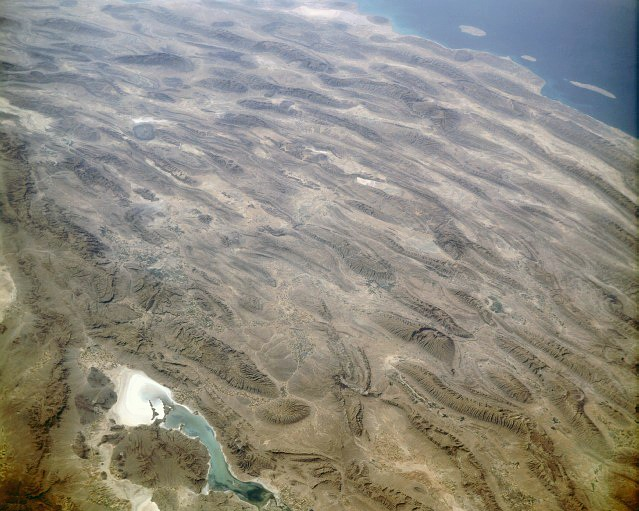
Zagros Mountains, seen from space.

Fold mountains are formed by the effects of folding on layers within the upper part of the Earth's crust. Before the development of the theory of plate tectonics and before the internal architecture of thrust belts became well understood, the term was used to describe most mountain belts but has otherwise fallen out of use.

== Formation ==
Fold mountains form in areas of thrust tectonics, such as where two tectonic plates move towards each other at convergent plate boundary. When plates and the continents riding on them collide or undergo subduction (that is – ride one over another), the accumulated layers of rock may crumple and fold like a tablecloth that is pushed across a table, particularly if there is a mechanically weak layer such as salt. Since the less dense continental crust "floats" on the denser mantle rocks beneath, the weight of any crustal material forced upward to form hills, plateaus or mountains must be balanced by the buoyancy force of a much greater volume forced downward into the mantle. Thus the continental crust is normally much thicker under mountains, compared to lower-lying areas. Rock can fold either symmetrically or asymmetrically. The upfolds are anticlines and the downfolds are synclines. Severely folded and faulted rocks are called nappes. In asymmetric folding there may also be recumbent and overturned folds. The mountains such formed are usually greater in length instead of breadth.

== Examples ==
- The Jura Mountains – A series of sub-parallel mountainous ridges that formed by folding over a Triassic evaporite decollement due to thrust movements in the foreland of the Alps
- The 'Simply Folded Belt' of the Zagros Mountains – A series of elongated anticlinal domes, mostly formed as detachment folds over underlying thrusts in the foreland of the Zagros collisional belt, generally above a basal decollement that formed in evaporite of the late Neoproterozoic to Early Cambrian Hormuz Formation
- The Akwapim-Togo ranges in Ghana
- The Ridge-and-Valley Appalachians in the eastern part of United States.
- The Ouachita Mountains of Arkansas and Oklahoma.

== See also ==
- Fault-block mountain – Mountains formed by vertical or tilt displacement of fault blocks
- Mountain formation – Geological processes that underlie the formation of mountains
- Aravalli Range – Mountain range in western India
