= Structural evolution of the Louisiana gulf coast =

The salt tectonics off the Louisiana gulf coast can be explained through two possible methods. The first method attributes spreading of the salt because of sedimentary loading while the second method points to slope instability as the primary cause of gliding of the salt. The first method results in the formation of growth faults in the overlying sediment. Growth faults are normal faults that occur simultaneously with sedimentation, causing them to have thicker sediment layers on the downthrown sides of the faults. In the second method both the salt and the sediment are moving, making it more likely to migrate.

== General Features of the Gulf of Mexico ==
Present-day map of the main tectonic provinces

The Gulf of Mexico is tectonically passive with low shear strength, but seaward slumping has produced a weak but mappable stress field. The stress map shows that in offshore Louisiana, maximum horizontal stress is oriented parallel to the shelf. Characteristics of the clastic sedimentary wedge have the greatest influence on the local stresses. Topography, lithology, and faults also affect how the stress map appears, but impermeable salt structures are significant because they resist movement. Basement tectonic control cannot readily affect the stress map since the salt's weak surface does not easily transmit stress.

The observation of minibasins (small sedimentary basins) and other features have suggested that the salt in the Gulf of Mexico primarily moves by spreading under differential sedimentary loading, which needs many conditions (e.g. huge amounts of deposited material above the salt) to be met. However, models and observation of the northern Gulf of Mexico favor gliding via slope instability. Controversies such as this example indicate that this area is structurally complicated.

== Mesozoic History ==
During the Mesozoic Era, the supercontinent Pangaea began to rift apart, forming the Gulf of Mexico basin within the late Triassic and early Jurassic periods. The rifting was accompanied by volcanic and nonmarine deposition. Later, because the newly formed basin was shallow and restricted from the Atlantic Ocean, the expansive salt evaporite deposits that the Gulf of Mexico is known for were created whenever saltwater periodically inundated the basin and then evaporated during the middle Jurassic. Not until the late Jurassic was the Gulf of Mexico connected to the Atlantic Ocean. Carbonate platforms formed during the early Cretaceous and were covered by terrigenous sediments toward the late Cretaceous.

== Cenozoic History ==
The Cenozoic Era is a time of extensive deformation of the northern Gulf of Mexico basin and underlying Jurassic salt due to progradation of the continental shelf; evidenced by the basinward progression of the major fault systems found in the area.

=== Paleocene-Eocene ===
The Wilcox growth fault province formed throughout present-day onshore Texas and Louisiana during the Paleocene and Eocene. The series of listric growth faults developed when sediment loading stimulated the collapse of salt bodies, which facilitated slumping toward the center of the basin.

=== Oligocene-Miocene ===
A detachment province of Oligocene-Miocene age is located both onshore and within the offshore continental shelf. Primarily made up of listric down-to-the-basin growth faults, the system is overlain by up to five kilometers of deltaic sediments. Subsidence of these sediments is often due to simple gravitational failure or deeper extensional faulting associated with salt withdrawal. The abundance of sandstone in the area makes Louisiana a prime petroleum reservoir. However, the orientation of faults to maximum stress influences how well a seal develops in order to trap petroleum. Because it is very impermeable, salt deflects any vertical petroleum migration that attempts to cut across the salt. Thick salt formation is also known to slow down the maturation of the trapped petroleum underneath. Most of the oil in the Gulf of Mexico was generated in the Late Miocene-Late Pliocene in a period called peak oil generation during which many zones of petroleum formed below the base of the salt bodies. The Late Oligocene-Miocene witnessed the shifting of the area of maximum sedimentation toward the Mississippi River delta.

=== Pliocene-Pleistocene ===
The outer continental shelf of Louisiana is laced with listric growth faults, which formed during the Pliocene-Pleistocene Epochs, that detach onto salt-withdrawal surfaces. This geometry is a result of sediment loading on salt structures. The subsequent normal faulting forced salt bodies to migrate updip, causing widespread salt welds and isolated salt structures underneath the system. Using recent models of salt deformation, seismic interpretation, and section restoration, it has been determined that there are three major salt structures in the Louisiana locality, all forming in the last couple million years. These are reactive diapirs, active diapirs, and passive diapirs. Reactive diapirs initiate and grow beneath grabens from normal faults, by rising up into the top layers of the crust through cracks formed by the grabens. Active diapirs form around minibasins by piercing into weak layers of overburdened sediment layers. Passive diapirs are formed by 'passively' growing in height through downbuilding.

=== Tabular Salt/Minibasin Province ===
Much of the Gulf of Mexico subsurface is dominated by relatively horizontal and undeformed salt that has advanced basinward ahead of continental shelf tectonic activity. The southern front of this salt is rimmed by thrust faults as a result of this movement, forming the Sigsbee Escarpment, a 1250-meter change in bathymetry. The salt in this region has stopped advancing recently during the Quaternary.
