= Geology of Barbados =

The geology of the island Barbados includes exposures of reef-related carbonate rocks spanning 85 percent of the island's surface. This coral rock formation is 70 meters thick and dates to the Pleistocene. Unlike neighboring islands in the Lesser Antilles volcanic arc, Barbados is unusual because it is not a volcanic island (the only volcanic rocks are some ash beds from eruptions on neighboring islands). Instead, the island of Barbados is the exposed part of the Barbados Ridge Accretionary Prism, accumulated as deep ocean sediments "scraped" to the surface as the Atlantic oceanic crust subducted beneath the Caribbean Plate.

The oldest rocks are in the Scotland Formation and include Eocene age turbidite and radiolarites. This unit is 4.5 kilometers thick from the sea floor to the surface. It is overlain by a syncline basin called the Woodbourne Trough, which includes pelagic sediments. Nappe formations of the Oceanic Formation, from a Miocene forearc basin filled with calcareous pelagic sediments and volcanic ash is thrust on top of the two older units. Mud, rich in organic molecules intrudes all of these units with diapirs—rising tendrils of mud with behavior similar to salt domes.
