= Salt surface structures =

Geologic feature

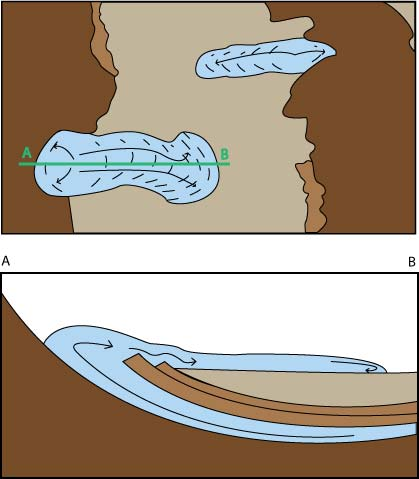
Schematic showing concave folded beds pierced by salt structures. Lower image shows a cross section of a possible sub-surface structure.

Salt surface structures are extensions of salt tectonics that form at the Earth's surface when either diapirs or salt sheets pierce through the overlying strata. They can occur in any location where there are salt deposits, namely in cratonic basins, synrift basins, passive margins and collisional margins. These are environments where mass quantities of water collect and then evaporate; leaving behind salt and other evaporites to form sedimentary beds. When there is a difference in pressure, such as additional sediment in a particular area, the salt beds – due to the unique ability of salt to behave as a fluid under pressure – form into new structures. Sometimes, these new bodies form subhorizontal or moderately dipping structures over a younger stratigraphic unit, which are called allochthonous salt bodies or salt surface structures.

== Salt ==
Image of example environments for salt deposition. Areas of likely deposition are shown in lavender.

=== Tectonic environments ===
Four key environments can facilitate salt deposition. These places allow salt-bearing water to collect and evaporate, leaving behind bedded deposits of solidified salt crystals. Below are short descriptions of these environments and a few examples.

1. Convergent boundaries – Areas where two plates collide; if there is water trapped between the two, there is the possibility of evaporation and deposition. The Mediterranean Sea, particularly during the Messinian salinity crisis, is a prime example.
2. Rifted boundaries/passive margins – Also known as divergent boundaries, these areas begin as rift basins, where extension is pulling apart the crust. If this rifting allows water to flood the resulting valley, salt deposition can occur. Examples include the Campos Basin, Brazil, Kwanza Basin, West Africa, and the Gulf of Mexico.
3. Cratonic basins – Within continental boundaries, salt deposition can occur anywhere that bodies of water can collect. Even away from ocean sources, water is capable of dissolving and carrying ions that can later precipitate as salts, and when the water evaporates, the salts are left behind. Examples of these basins are the South Oman Salt Basin and the Michigan Basin. In the past, there was a great shallow sea covering most of the Great Plains region of the United States; when this sea dried up, it created the Strataca deposit now mined in Kansas, among others.

=== Characteristics ===
Salt has two key characteristics that make it unique in a tectonic setting, and important economically. The first is that salt (and other evaporites) deform plastically over geologic time, and thus behave as a fluid rather than a rigid structure. This allows structures with salt components to deform more easily and have a slightly different appearance. Take, for example the Appalachians, which contain some salt deposits, and the Rocky Mountains, which is an accretionary terrain with little to no salt. This also allows for the creation of structural traps for oil and gas, as well as metals which makes them sought after targets in industry. The second, which is the fact that evaporites are often less dense, or more buoyant, than the surrounding rock, which aids in its mobility and creates a Rayleigh Taylor instability. This means that the less dense substance will find a way to rise through or away from the more dense one. In salt tectonics, this occurs in three ways; the first is differential loading, where the salt flows from an area of high pressure to lower pressure, the second is gravitational spreading, where the salt spreads out laterally under its own gravitational weight, the last is thermal convection, where warmer – and thus less dense – salt rises through colder and more dense salt. This is only seen in laboratory settings due to the unlikely occurrence of salt bodies with great enough temperature variance.

== Evolution histories ==
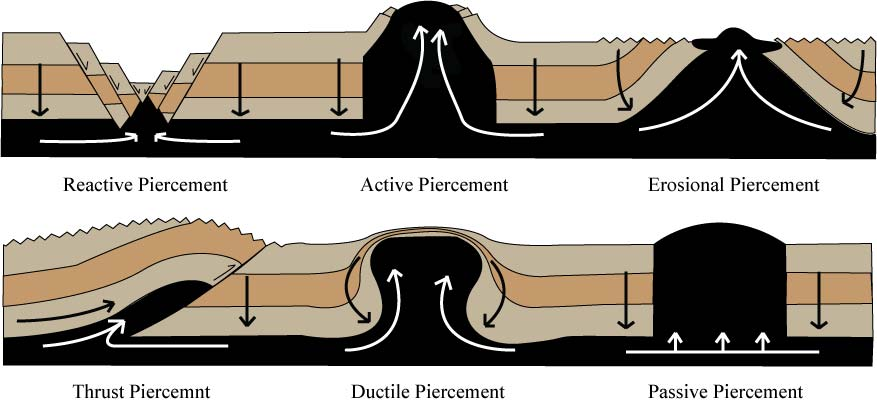
Illustration of the six piercement types; black arrows show the forces acting on the salt layer, white arrows show the reaction of the salt to these forces.

In order for originally horizontal beds to form the allochthonous salts, they must first break free of their geological restraints. The first base structure can be formed in a combination of six ways:

1. Reactive piercement – a normal fault synrift relieves pressure above the salt layer. This causes the salt to flow into the area of lower pressure to maintain its equilibrium.
2. Active piercement – salt moves through sediments where there are no structures to take advantage of.
3. Erosional piercement – overlying sediments are eroded away, revealing the present salt dome.
4. Thrust piercement – local thrust faults apply force to salt sheets which follow the path of least resistance up the footwall of the fault.
5. Ductile piercement – not so much a 'piercing' movement, but local differential pressure force the salt to rise through weaker overlying sediments. Occurs due to the Rayleigh-Taylor instability created by salt's low density.
6. Passive piercement – after the salt column has initially pierced the overlying sediments, the rate it rises matches or supersedes the growing sediment layers.

From here there are three paths that a forming surface structure can take. Two stem from a diapir base, and the third from a sheet base. The sheet becomes a source-fed thrust, not unlike the thrust piercement, it takes advantage of local fault planes to rise. The difference between the two diapir bases, is that one, termed a plug-fed thrust, has a sediment cap over the top, preventing the salt from freely flowing until building pressure forces it through the cap; the other, a plug-fed extrusion, lacks the sediment cap and is allowed to flow freely.

== Types of surface structures ==
Once the salt structure has reached the surface, it is termed one of four names; salt-wing intrusions, extrusive advance, open-toed advance or thrust advance. There is a certain level of transition between the four, as some process, such as the dissolution and removal of salt, deposition of new sediment, erosion and thrusting can shift the characteristics between them.

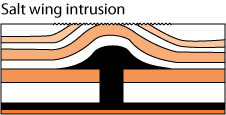
Salt-wing intrusion

=== Salt-wing intrusions ===
Salt-wing intrusions are technically underground structures; found in shortening, or compressional, systems, they form radial salt wedges between detached bedding planes. However, the caps on them can be eroded away, revealing the salt and transforming it into an extrusive advance.

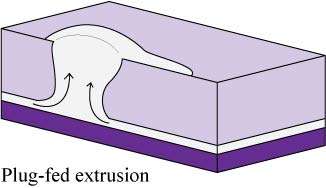
Extrusive advance shown in 3D

=== Extrusive advance ===
Extrusive advances begin once the diapir reaches the ground's surface and the salt is exposed. The salt then spreads from the feeder under gravitational pressure alone. This flowing has two consequences that form the structure. First, as the top of the salt flows faster than the bottom, there is a frontal roll along the leading edge. Second, the salt overrides any sediment being deposited at the same time, causing the feature to climb upsection and prograde. Over time, some of the salt is dissolved away, leaving a layer of impurities and other sediments behind, the thickness of this roof, or sediment cap, depends on the percentage of impurities in the salt and the sedimentation rate of the area.

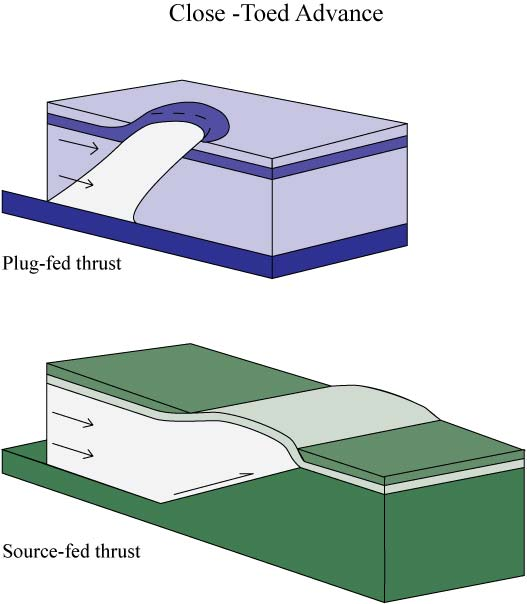
Thrust or close-toed advance in 3D

=== Thrust advance ===
Thrust advances return to salt sheets as their primary base structure, and form because salt provides a weak detachment layer for faulting systems. When force is applied in such systems, the buried sheet will advance along the hanging wall. There are three driving processes in this type of advance; gravitational pressure of both the salt and overlying sediments, spreading of the margin and general plate tectonics.

=== Open-toed advance ===
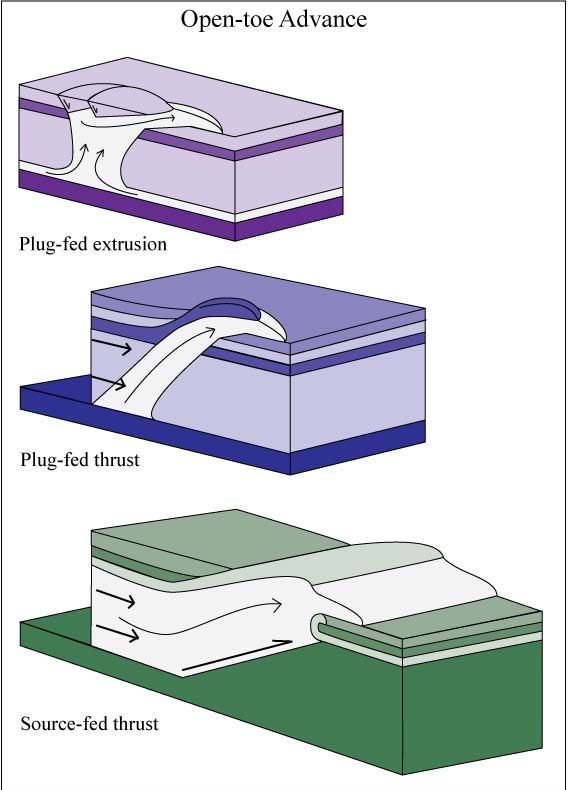
Open-toe advance in 3D. Wide arrows show the direction of motion, thin arrows indicate salt motion.

Open-toed advances can either evolve from the dissolution of salts from an extrusive advance structure, or it could have evolved from a plug-fed thrust. They are partially buried advances where only the advancing edge, called the toe, is open to flow, which is controlled by a combination of gravitational forces and differential pressure of the overlying sediments. There are three described sediment roof types: synclinal basins – isolated patches of consolidated sediments, prograding roof – a growing sheet of sediments, and salt breakout – where the salt had to force its way through the overlying sediments.
