= Salt dome =

Structural dome formed of salt or halite

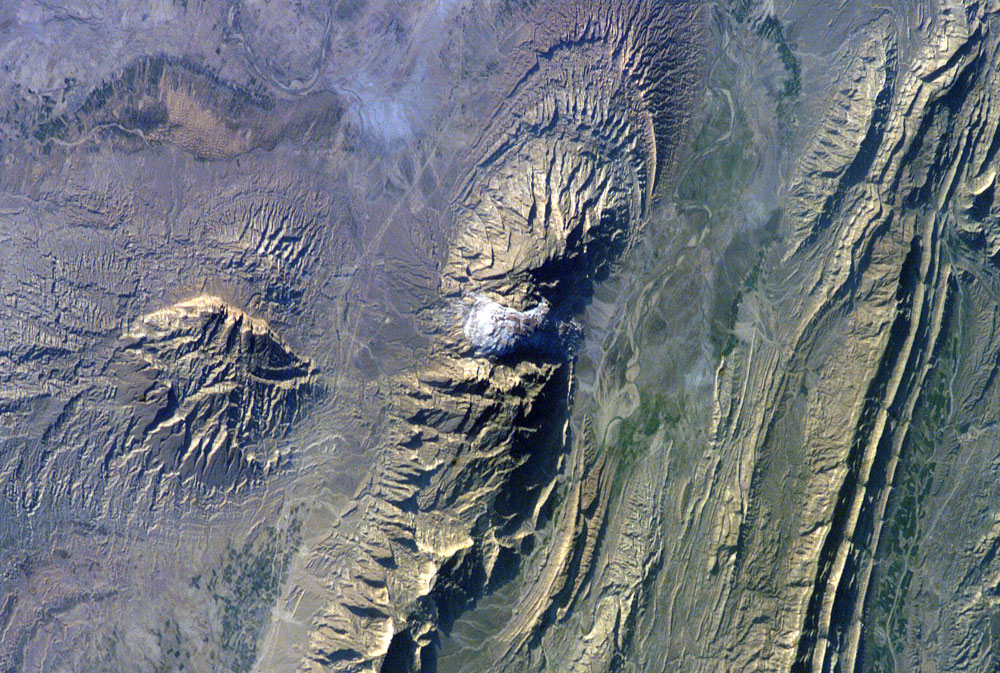
Astronaut photography of Jashak salt dome (the white area in the middle) in the Zagros Mountains in Bushehr province, Iran

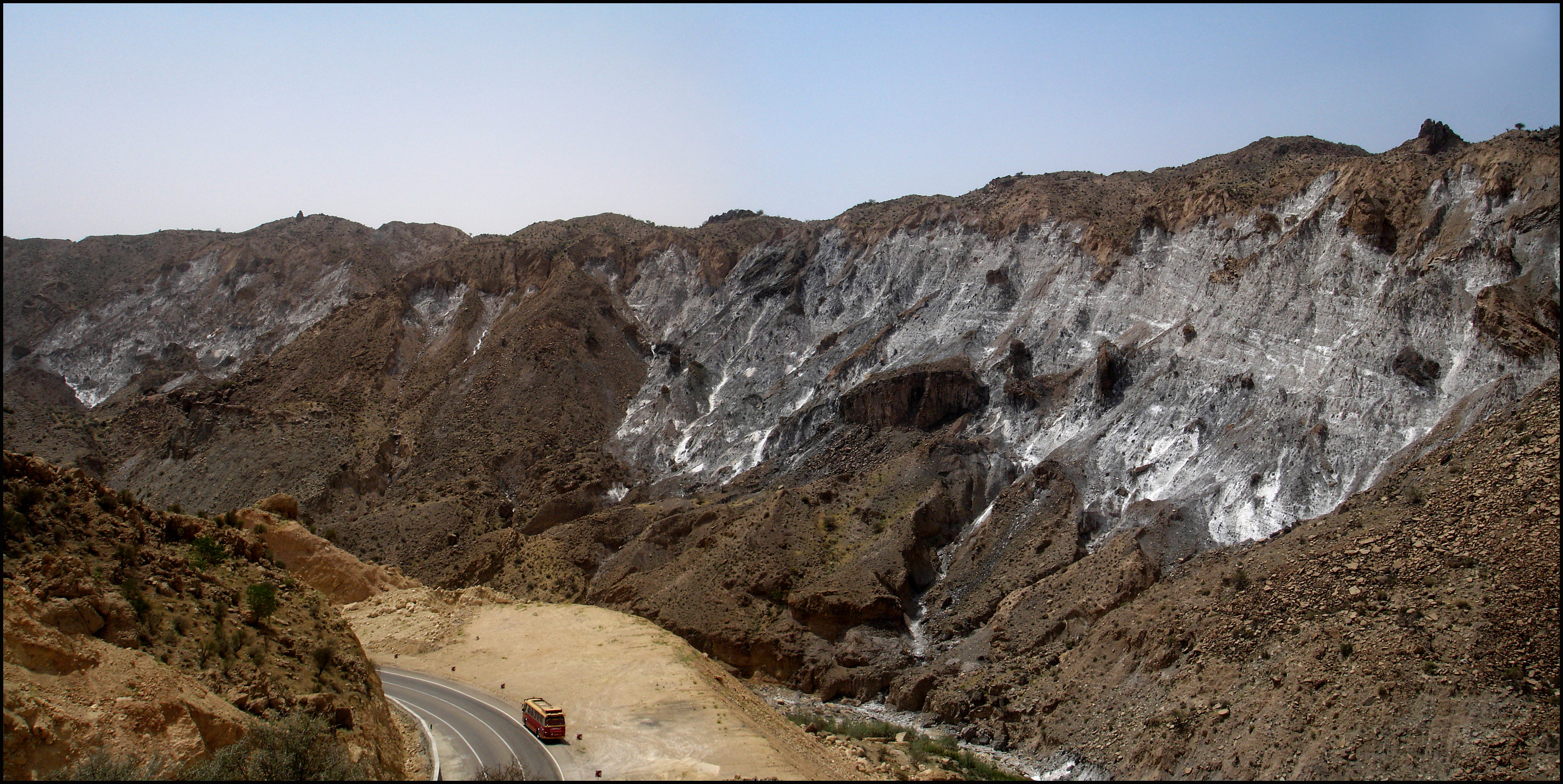
Salt dome in Fars province, Iran

A salt dome is a type of structural dome formed when rock salt (or other evaporite minerals) pushes into overlying rocks in a process known as diapirism. Salt domes can have unique surface and subsurface structures, and they can be discovered using techniques such as seismic reflection. They are important in petroleum geology as they can function as petroleum traps.

== Formation ==
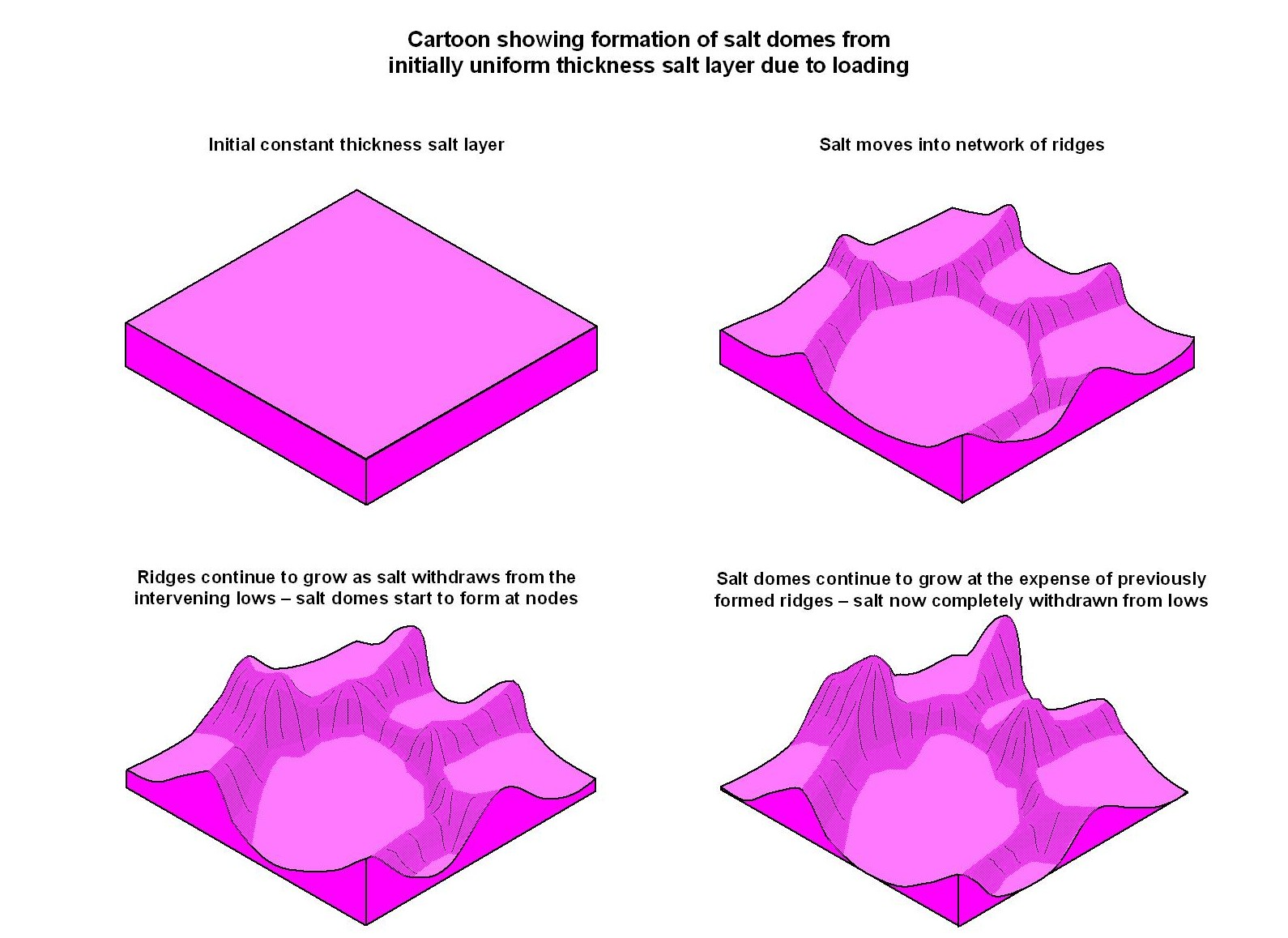
Diagram showing formation of salt domes

Stratigraphically, salt basins developed periodically from the Proterozoic to the Neogene. The formation of a salt dome begins with the deposition of salt in a restricted basin. In these basins, the outflow of water exceeds inflow. Specifically, the basin loses water through evaporation, resulting in the precipitation and deposition of salt. While the rate of sedimentation of salt is significantly larger than the rate of sedimentation of clastics, it is recognized that a single evaporation event is rarely enough to produce the vast quantities of salt needed to form a layer thick enough for the formation of salt diapirs, indicating that a sustained period of episodic flooding and evaporation of the basin must occur.

Over time, the layer of salt is covered with deposited sediment, becoming buried under an increasingly large overburden. Previously, researchers believed that the compaction of overlying sediment and subsequent decrease in buoyancy led to salt rising and intruding into the overburden due to its ductility, thereby creating a salt diapir. However, after the 1980s, the primary force that drives the flow of salt is considered to be differential loading.

Differential loading can be caused by gravitational forces (gravitational loading), forced displacement of salt boundaries (displacement loading), or thermal gradients (thermal loading). The flow of the salt overcomes the strength of the overburden as well as boundary friction aided by overburden extension, erosion, thrust faults, ductile thinning, or other forms of regional deformation. The vertical growth of salt formations creates pressure on the upward surface, causing extension and faulting. Once the salt completely pierces the overburden, it can rise through a process known as passive diapirism where the accumulation of sediments around the diapir contribute to its growth and eventually form into a dome.

== Discovery mechanisms ==
Some salt domes can be seen from Earth's surface. They can also be located by finding unique surface structures and surrounding phenomena. For instance, salt domes can contain or be near sulfur springs and natural gas vents. Some salt domes have salt sheets that extrude from the top of the dome; these are referred to as salt plugs. These plugs can coalesce to form salt canopies, which can then be remobilized by roof sedimentation, with the most prominent example in the northern Gulf of Mexico basin. Another structure that can form from salt domes are salt welds. These occur when the growth of a dome is prevented by an exhausted supply of salt, and the top and bottom contacts merge.

Salt domes have also been located using seismic refraction and seismic reflection. The latter was developed based on techniques from the former and is more effective. Seismic refraction uses seismic waves to characterize subsurface geologic conditions and structures. Seismic reflection highlights the presence of a stark density contrast between the salt and surrounding sediment. Seismic techniques are particularly effective as salt domes are typically depressed blocks of crust bordered by parallel normal faults (graben) that can be flanked by reverse faults. Advances in seismic reflection and the expansion of offshore petroleum exploration efforts led to the discovery of numerous salt domes soon after World War II.

== Commercial uses ==
Salt domes are the site of many of the world's hydrocarbon provinces. The rock salt of the salt dome is mostly impermeable, so, as it moves up towards the surface, it penetrates and bends existing rock along with it. As strata of rock are penetrated, they are, generally, bent upwards where they meet the dome, forming pockets and reservoirs of petroleum and natural gas (known as petroleum traps). In 1901, an exploratory oil well was drilled into Spindletop Hill near Beaumont, Texas. This led to the discovery of the first salt dome, revealed the importance of salt to the formation of hydrocarbon accumulations, and produced enough oil for petroleum to become an economically feasible fuel for the United States. Several countries use solution mining to form caverns for holding large amounts of oil or gas reserves.

The caprock above the salt domes can contain deposits of native sulfur (recovered by the Frasch process). They can also contain deposits of metals, sodium salts, nitrates, and other substances, which can be used in products such as table salt and chemical de-icers.

== Occurrence ==
Salt domes occur in many parts of the world where there is a sufficiently thick layer of rock salt developed.

=== Hormuz Formation ===
In the Middle East, the upper Neoproterozoic salt of the Hormuz Formation is associated with widespread salt dome formation in most parts of the Persian Gulf and onshore in Iran, Iraq, United Arab Emirates, and Oman. The thicker salt is found in a series of basins: the Western Gulf, the Southern Gulf, and the Oman salt basins.

=== Paradox Basin ===
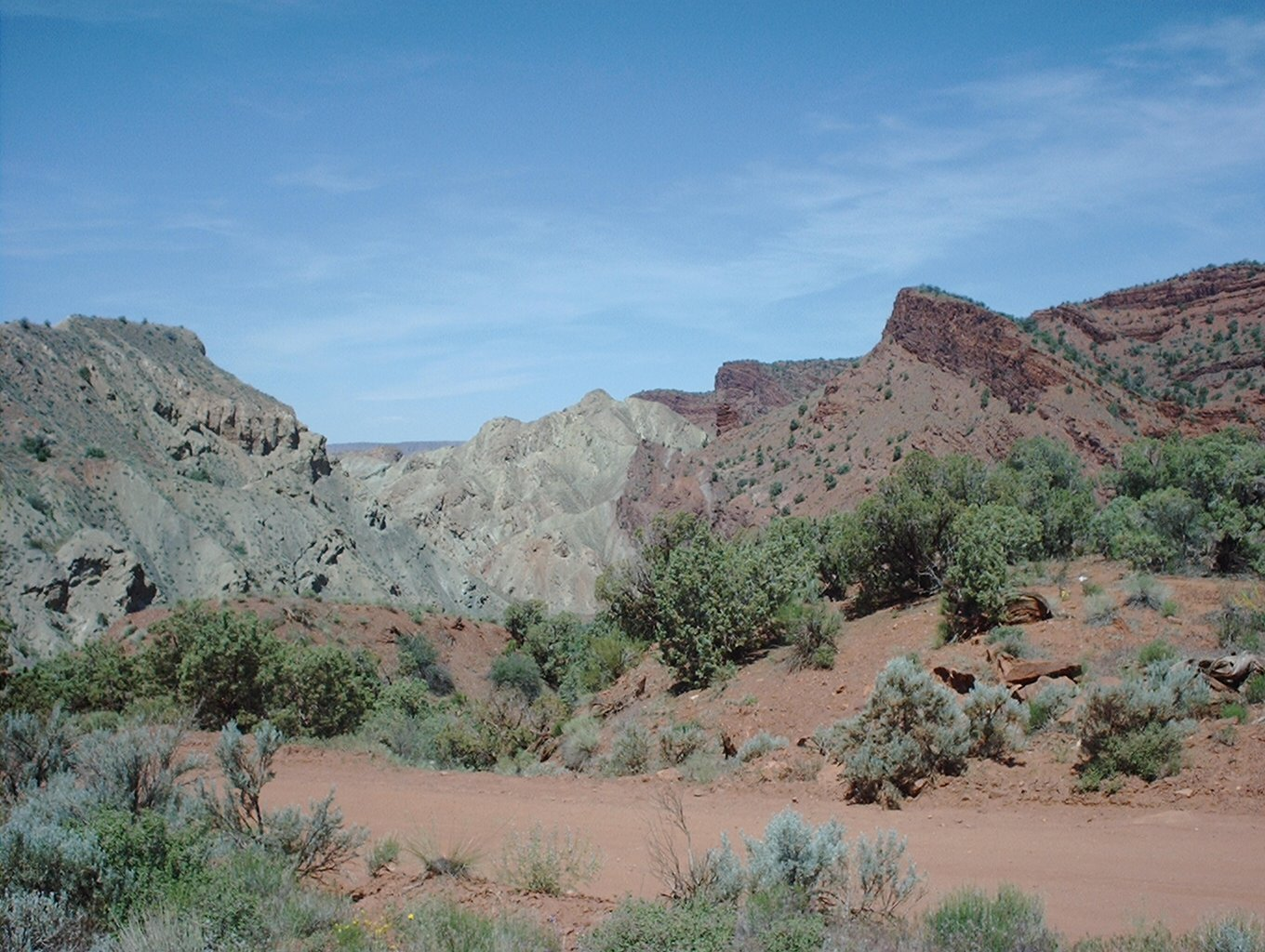
End-on view of emergent Onion Creek salt dome between remnants of displaced overburden

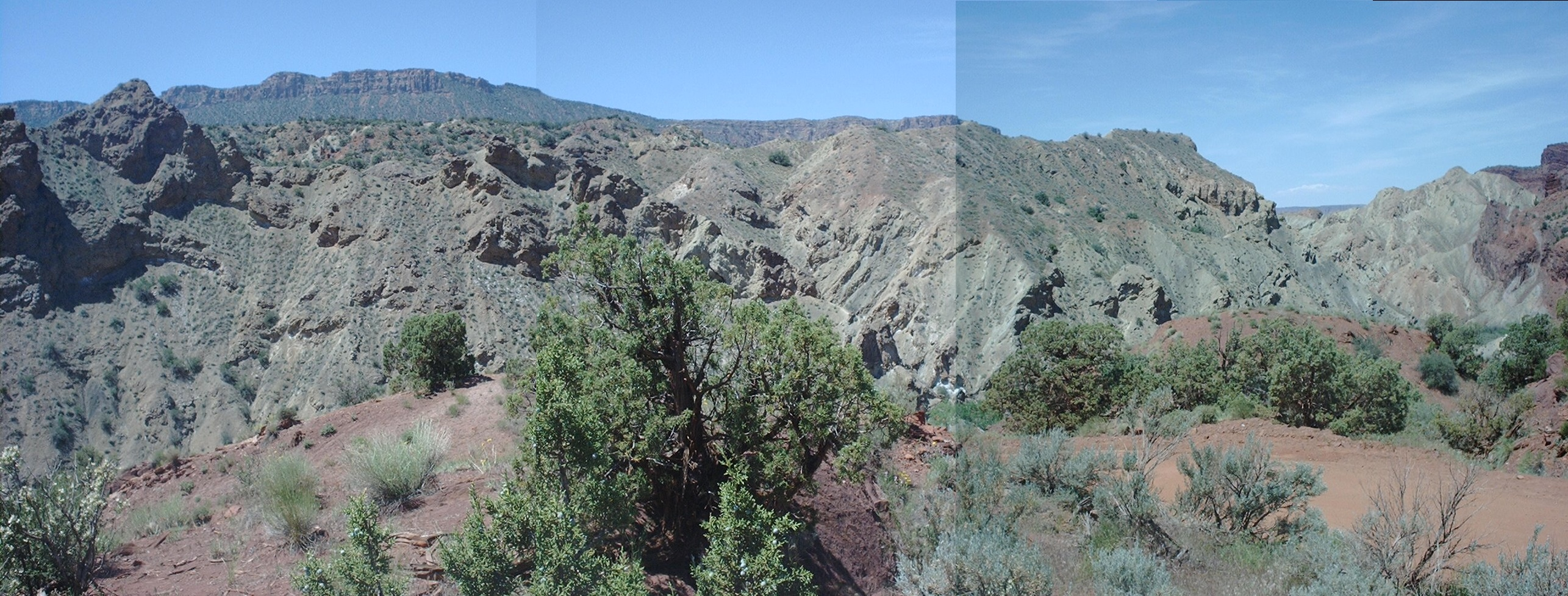
Lateral view of emergent salt dome from ridge of remnant of displaced overburden

Pennsylvanian age salt of the Paradox Formation forms salt domes throughout the Paradox Basin in the US, which extends from eastern Utah, through southwestern Colorado into northwestern New Mexico.

An example of an emergent salt dome is at Onion Creek, Utah / Fisher Towers near Moab, Utah. A Paradox Formation salt body that has risen as a ridge through several hundred meters of overburden, predominantly sandstone. As the salt body rose, the overburden formed an anticline (arching upward along its center line) which fractured and eroded to expose the salt body.

=== Barents Sea ===
Offshore northern Norway in the southwestern Barents Sea, thick Upper Carboniferous–Lower Permian salt was deposited, forming salt domes in the Hammerfest and Nordkapp basins.

=== Zechstein basin ===
In northwest Europe Upper Permian salt of the Zechstein Group has formed salt domes over the central and southern North Sea, extending eastwards into Germany.

=== Morocco–Nova Scotia ===
Upper Triassic salt forms salt domes in the Essaouira Basin onshore and offshore Morocco. An equivalent salt sequence, the Argo Formation, is associated with salt dome formation on the conjugate Nova Scotia margin.

=== Gulf of Mexico ===
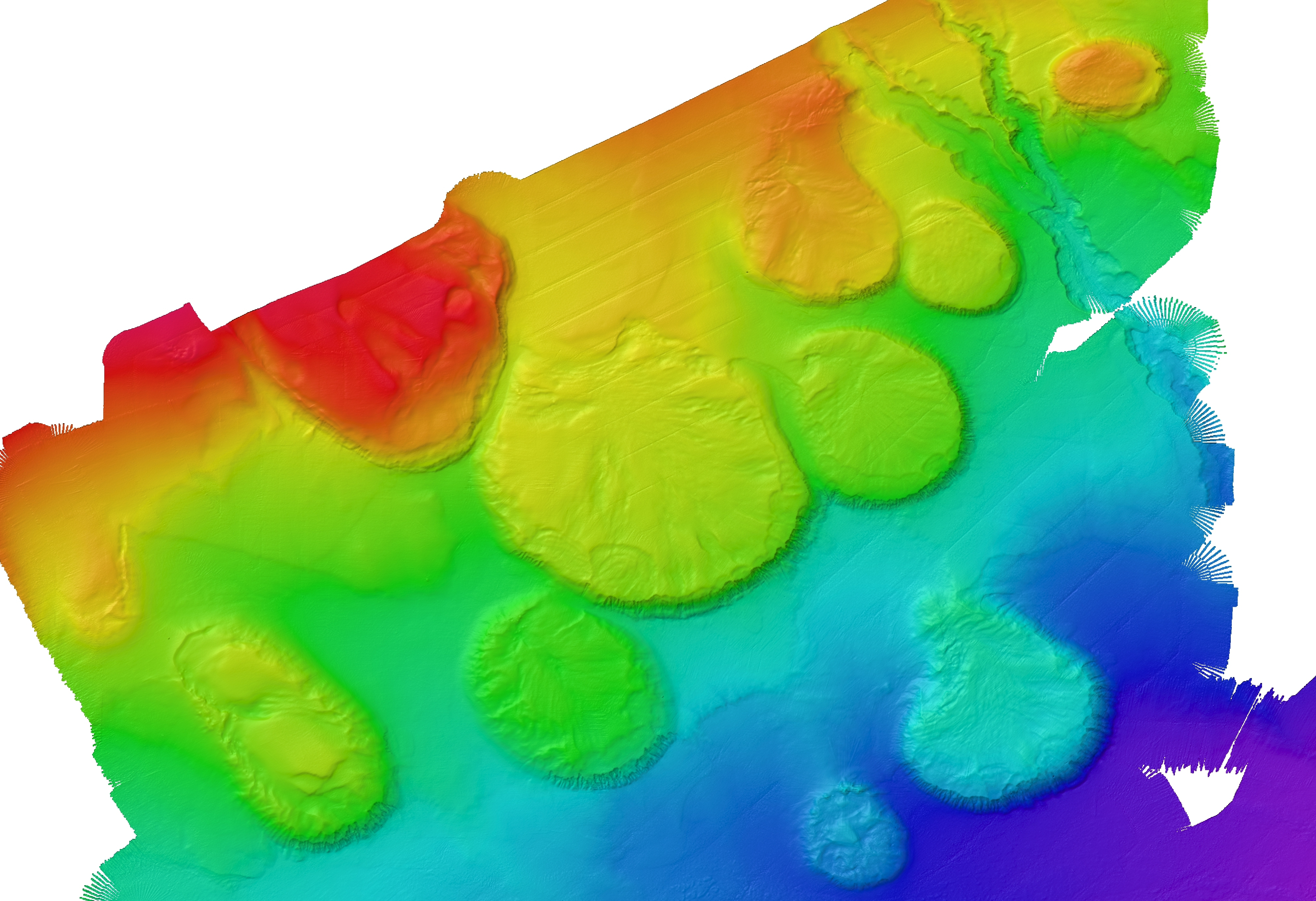
Imaging of undersea salt domes in the Gulf of Mexico

The Gulf Coast is home to over 500 salt domes formed from Middle Jurassic Louann Salt. This region is home to most of the US Strategic Petroleum Reserve. Avery Island was formed by a salt dome.

=== South Atlantic salt basins ===
During the break-up of the south Atlantic, Aptian (Lower Cretaceous) age salt was deposited within the area of thinned crust on both the Brazilian and conjugate Angola/Gabon margins forming many salt domes.

=== Messinian salt ===
During the Messinian salinity crisis (Late Miocene), thick salt layers were formed as the Mediterranean Sea dried out. Later deposition, once the sea refilled, triggered the formation of salt domes.

== See also ==
- Gorleben salt dome – Salt dome
- Plasticity (physics) – Non-reversible deformation of a solid material in response to applied forces
- Salt glacier – Flow of solid salt on Earth's surface
- Underground hydrogen storage
