= Karmostaj =

Village in Iran

Karmostaj كرمستج
- village
- Location within Iran
- Country: Iran

Area
  - Total: 867 km^{2} (335 sq mi)

Population (2017)
  - Total: 1,626
  - Density: 1.88/km^{2} (4.86/sq mi)
- Time zone: UTC+3:30 (IRST)

Karmostaj (Persian: کرمستج) is a village in Lar, Iran. At the most recent census, its population was 1,626, comprising 336 families. There is a nearby diapir Jason's basement
