= Hormuz Formation =

Ediacaran sequence of evaporites in Iran

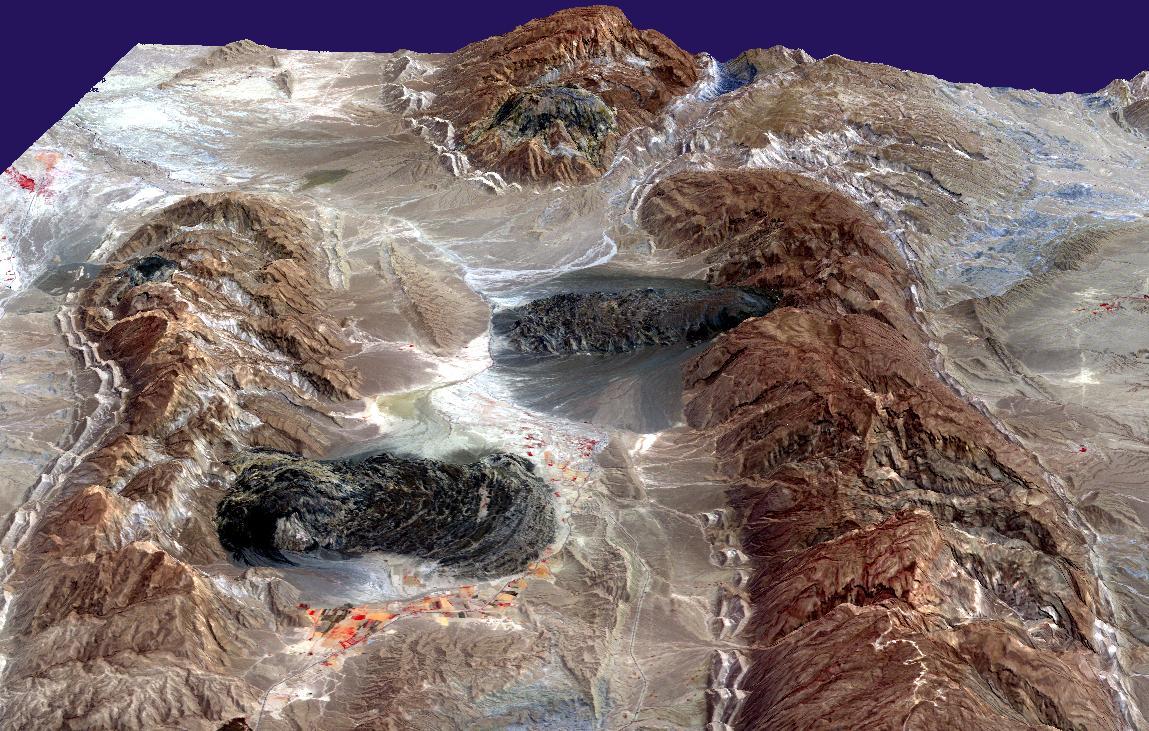
Salt glaciers (dark grey areas) derived from Hormuz halites, extruding from anticlinal crests in the Zagros Mountains of southern Iran

The Hormuz Formation, Hormuz Series, Hormuz Evaporites or Hormuz Group is a sequence of evaporites that were deposited during the Ediacaran (Late Neoproterozoic) to Early Cambrian, a period previously referred to as the Infra-Cambrian. Most exposures of this sequence are in the form of emergent salt diapirs within anticlines of the Zagros fold and thrust belt. As a result of their involvement in post-depositional salt tectonics, the internal stratigraphy of the sequence is relatively poorly understood. They are the lateral equivalent of the evaporite-bearing Ara Group in the South Oman Basin.

== Distribution ==
The Hormuz Formation is known from a wide area of the Zagros Mountains and around and beneath the Persian Gulf. Two main depositional basins have been recognised, the North Gulf and South Gulf Basins, separated by the Qatar Arch. The basins were formed as a result of extensional tectonics towards the end of the Pan-African Orogeny. The main structure formed during this period were NW-SE trending dextral (right lateral) strike-slip faults and NE-SW trending extensional faults.

== Stratigraphy ==
Most occurrences of the Hormuz Formation are highly disturbed tectonically. However, a broad stratigraphy has been recognised.

== Effect on Zagros structure ==
Halite layers within the Hormuz sequence form the most important decollement level within the Zagros fold and thrust belt. The presence and thickness of the halites has had a major influence on the geometry of the thrust belt and such variations has been used to explain lateral changes in structural style along the belt.
