= Zagros fold and thrust belt =

Geologic zone

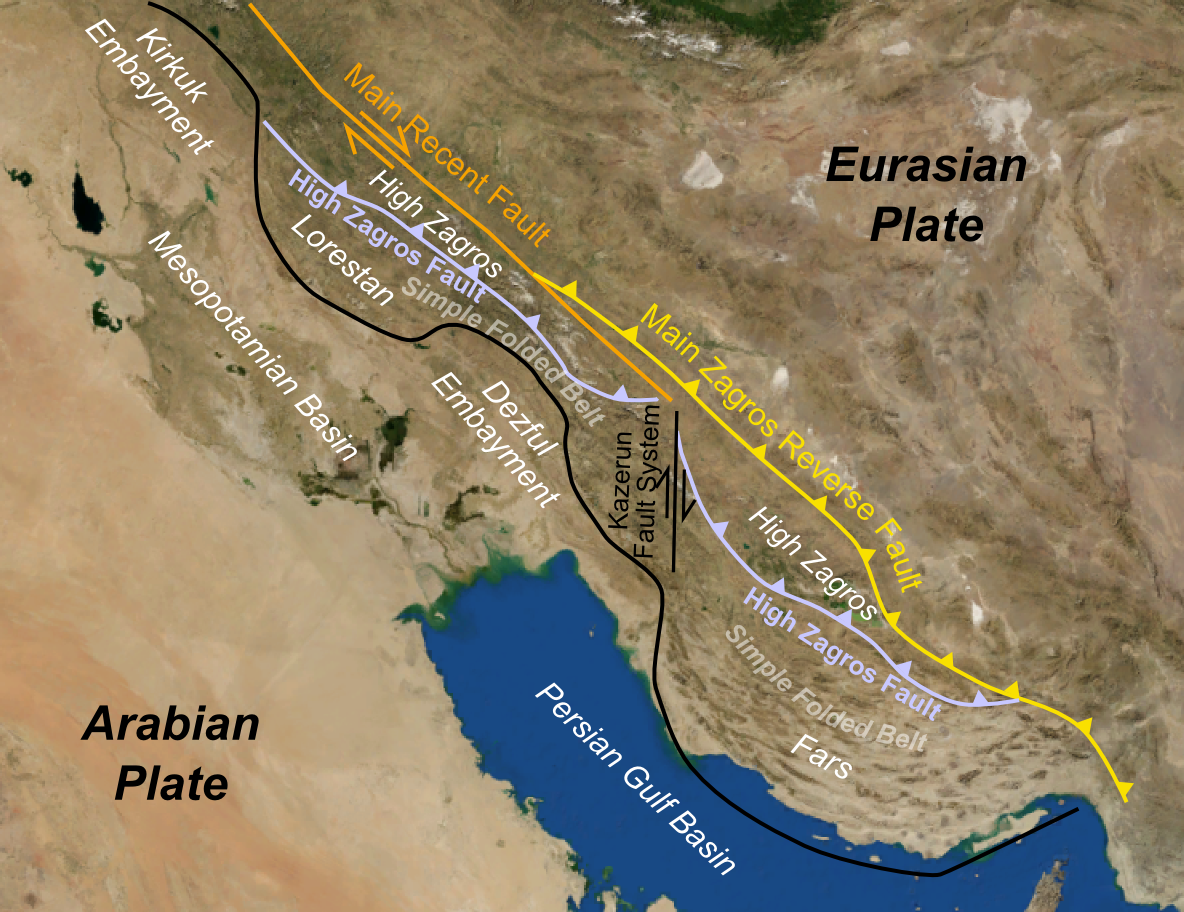
Main structural features of the Zagros fold-thrust belt

The Zagros fold and thrust belt (Zagros FTB) is an approximately 1,800-kilometre (1,100 mi) long zone of deformed crustal rocks, formed in the foreland of the collision between the Arabian plate and the Eurasian plate. It is host to one of the world's largest petroleum provinces, containing about 49% of the established hydrocarbon reserves in fold and thrust belts (FTBs) and about 7% of all reserves globally.

== Plate tectonic setting ==
The Zagros FTB is formed along a section of the plate boundary that is subject to oblique convergence with the Arabian plate moving northwards with respect to the Eurasian plate at about 3 cm per year. The degree of obliqueness reduces southwards along the Zagros, with the collision becoming near orthogonal within the Fars domain. The relative movement between the plates is only partly taken up within the Zagros, the remainder is taken up by deformation in the Alborz mountains and the Lesser Caucasus Mountains to the north of the Iranian plateau and along the zone formed by the Greater Caucasus Mountains, the Apsheron-Balkan Sill and the Kopet Dag mountains further north again.

== Geometry ==
The Zagros FTB extends for about 1,800 km (1,100 mi) from the Bitlis suture zone in the northwest to the boundary with the Makran Trench, east of the Strait of Hormuz, in the southeast. The belt varies in width with two main salients (where the thrust belt bulges out towards the foreland) in the Lorestan and Fars domains and two main embayments (between the bulges) at Kirkuk and Dezful. The variation in geometry along the strike is attributed to the distribution of the late Proterozoic to Early Cambrian Hormuz salt layer, with a thick and continuous salt being present beneath the salients and either missing, thin or discontinuous in the embayments. The distribution of the Hormuz salt is controlled by the extent of late Proterozoic basins. The belt is also divided into zones from northeast to southwest. Next to the Main Zagros Reverse Fault is a zone sometimes referred to as the 'High Zagros', the highest part of the Zagros Mountains reaching heights in excess of 4,500 m (14,800 ft), with the 'High Zagros Fault' forming its southwestern boundary. The next zone between the High Zagros Fault and the Main Frontal Fault (also Mountain Front Flexure) is known as the 'Simply Folded Zone', characterised by many elongate folds and very few surface faults. The zone to the southwest of the Main Frontal Fault is considered to be part of the foreland basin although active structures are observed as far out as the Zagros Frontal Fault.

=== Kirkuk embayment ===
In northern Iraq, the Zagros FTB is relatively narrow and this area is referred to as the Kirkuk embayment. This part of the fold belt lacks an effective basal Hormuz salt detachment.

=== Lorestan domain ===
The Lorestan (or Lurestan) domain forms the northerly of the two main salients in the Zagros FTB. The structural style of the simply folded zone is interpreted here to be dominated by detachment folding with some degree of disharmonic folding (folding of differing wavelengths at different structural levels). The disharmony occurs between a deeper layer bounded by the basal and Dashtak Formation décollement levels and shallower one between the Dashtak décollement and the surface. There is also evidence of a thick-skinned element to the deformation. The lack of Hormuz salt exposed at the surface makes the nature of the basal detachment less certain than in the Fars domain, but the presence of this salt layer is inferred from the observation that the taper angle (the angle between the basal detachment and the current topographic slope) is identical to that where the salt is proven further south.

=== Dezful embayment ===
Between the two main salients of the Zagros FTB, the Dezful embayment developed in an area that lacked an effective basal Hormuz salt detachment, resulting in a steeper topographic slope of 2°, compared to 1° for both the Lorestan and Fars domains. During the Miocene, this area became a depocentre in which locally thick Gachsaran salt was deposited. The presence of locally thick Gachsaran salt has caused disharmonic folding between the sequences above and below that layer.

=== Fars domain ===
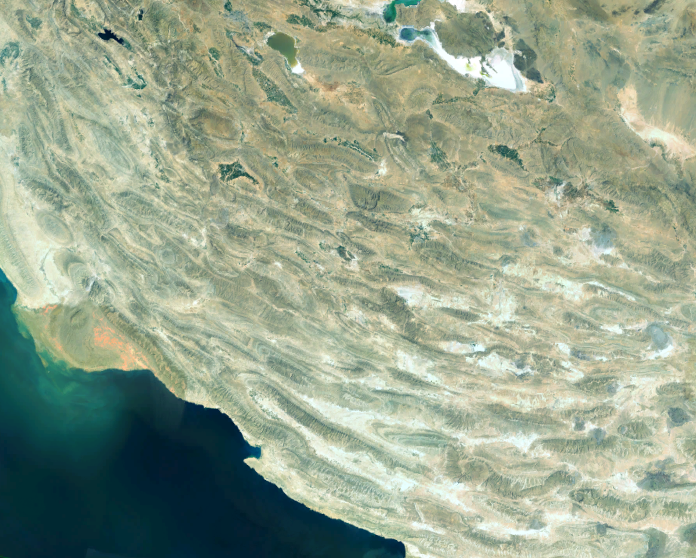
Satellite view of the Fars Domain, showing the exposed anticlines, locally with extruding salt glaciers

The Fars salient forms the southeastern end of the Zagros FTB. This area is underlain by a thick Hormuz salt layer that comes to the surface in several places where it extrudes from the crests of anticlines, forming salt glaciers, although it may be missing over the Fars platform, a continuation of an area of the foreland in which the salt layer is not present.

=== Kazerun fault system ===
This dextral fault system transfers some of the dextral displacement along the Main Recent Fault onto thrust faults and folds of the Fars domain as the relative motion changes from strongly oblique to near orthogonal. It also forms the effective southeastern boundary to the Dezful embayment. In detail the Kazerun fault system consist of a series of en echelon segments within an overall fan shaped zone. From the focal depth of earthquakes along this zone it is clear that these faults are developed within the underlying basement rocks.

=== Persian Gulf ===
The Persian Gulf and the area of lowland occupied by the alluvial plain of the Tigris–Euphrates river system, known as the 'Mesopotamian Basin', together represent the active foreland basin to the Zagros FTB, caused by the loading of the leading edge of the Arabian plate by the Zagros thrust sheets. The gulf is being progressively infilled by the southeastward prograding delta of the river system.

== Development of the Zagros FTB ==
Northeastward subduction of Tethyan oceanic crust continued along this portion of the Eurasian plate until continental crust of the Arabian plate became involved in this convergent boundary. The exact timing of the onset of the subsequent collision is uncertain although there is evidence of some deformation during the deposition of the Asmari Formation in the Oligocene, or possibly as early as the Late Eocene. Deformation within the Zagros FTB has continued from then until the present day, although unconformities of regional extent suggest that there have been several distinct phases of deformation. Unconformities have been recognised at the base and top of the Asmari Formation (Late Eocene and Early Miocene), at the base of the Agha Jari Formation (late mid-Miocene) at the base of the Bakhtyari Formation (latest Pliocene) and mid Pleistocene, interpreted to date these separate phases. These deformation pulses were associated with southwestward migration of the active deformation front.

There is no evidence of continued subduction of oceanic crust beneath the Eurasian plate along this part of the plate boundary, in contrast to the neighbouring segment along the Makran Trench, an active subduction zone, where a dipping slab is well imaged by seismic tomography. The ending of subduction has been linked to evidence that the Main Zagros Reverse Fault is no longer active, suggesting that further deformation is occurring by distributed deformation of the leading edge of the Arabian plate. This is consistent with observations of recent seismicity.

== Economic importance ==
The Zagros FTB contains 49% of the world's hydrocarbon reserves hosted in fold and thrust belts and about 7% of all reserves. The Zagros province includes many giant and supergiant oilfields, such as the Kirkuk Field with over ten billion barrels of remaining oil reserves as of 1998, and the Asmari Reservoir, an Oligocene-Miocene limestone subsequently folded into anticline structural traps during the Zagros Orogeny.
