= Jashak salt dome =

Natural salt deposit in Iran

Coordinates: 28°15′00″N 51°42′00″E

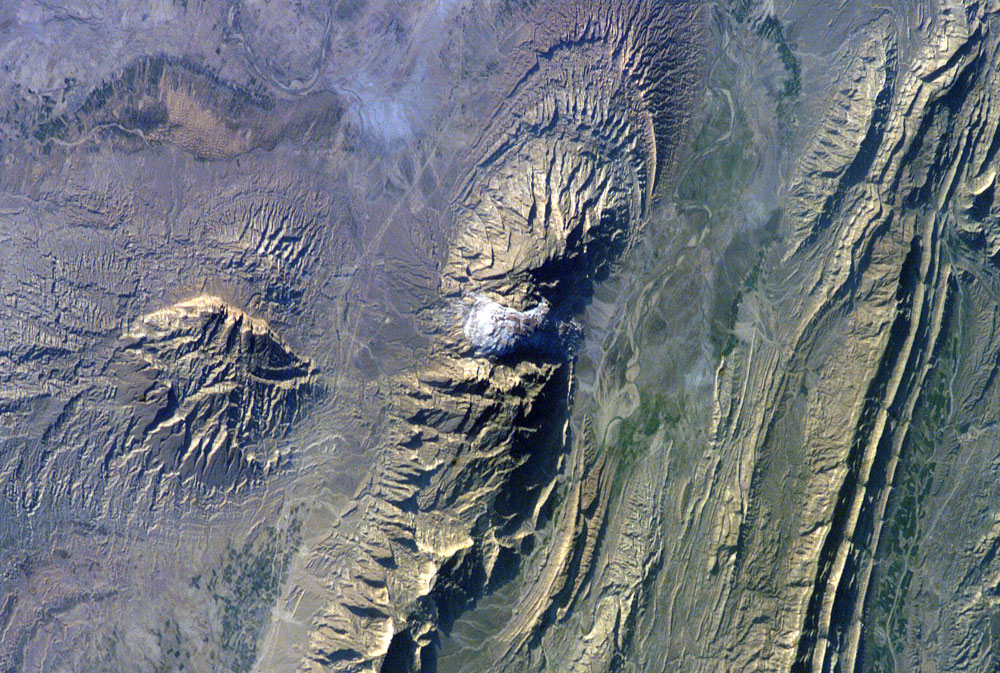
Aerial image of the Zagros Mountains, showing the Jashak salt dome as a white area in the centre

The Jashak salt dome (Persian: گنبد نمکی جاشک ( دشتی)), in Persian: Kuh-e-Namak (Persian: کوه نمک means mountain of salt), also known as the Dashti salt dome, lies in the Zagros Mountains in southwestern Iran. The salt dome is Dashti County in Bushehr Province and lies near the Gankhak-e Raisi in Kaki (15k) and Dashti County. A salt dome is a natural deposit of salt, formed through evaporation.

The Jashak dome is considered one of the most beautiful of Iran's salt domes, which are included in the tentative list of world heritage sites of Iran.

== Links ==
- Geomorphological Structures of Jashak Salt Dome--《地学前缘》2009年S1期
- International Conference on Dry-Land Ecology
