= Diapir =

Type of geologic intrusion

Diapirs in a subducting plate boundary

A diapir (/ˈdaɪ.əpɪər/; from French diapir [djapiʁ], from Ancient Greek διαπειραίνω (diapeiraínō) 'to pierce through') is a type of intrusion in which a more mobile and ductilely deformable material is forced into brittle overlying rocks. Depending on the tectonic environment, diapirs can range from idealized mushroom-shaped Rayleigh–Taylor instability structures in regions with low tectonic stress such as in the Gulf of Mexico to narrow dikes of material that moves along tectonically induced fractures in surrounding rock.

The term was introduced by Romanian geologist Ludovic Mrazek, who was the first to understand the principle of salt tectonics and plasticity. The term diapir may be applied to igneous intrusions, but it is more commonly applied to non-igneous, relatively cold materials, such as salt domes and mud diapirs. If a salt diapir reaches the surface, it can flow because salt becomes ductile with a small amount of moisture, forming a salt glacier.

== Occurrence ==
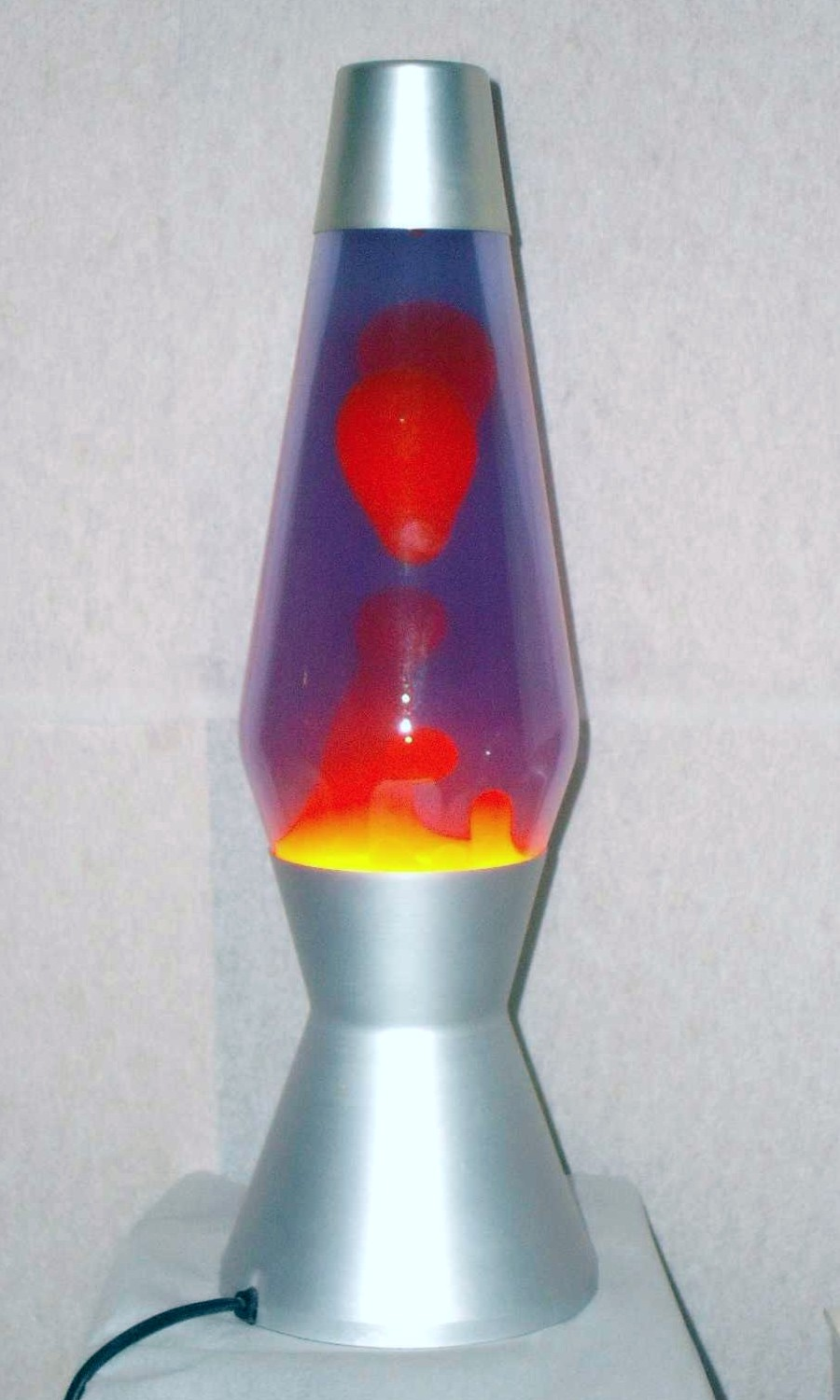
A lava lamp illustrates Rayleigh–Taylor instability-type diapirism in which the tectonic stresses are low.

Differential loading causes salt deposits covered by overburden (sediment) to rise upward toward the surface and pierce the overburden, forming diapirs (including salt domes), pillars, sheets, or other geological structures.

In addition to Earth-based observations, diapirism is thought to occur on Neptune's moon Triton, Jupiter's moon Europa, Saturn's moon Enceladus, and Uranus's moon Miranda.

== Formation ==
Diapirs commonly intrude buoyantly upward along fractures or zones of structural weakness through denser overlying rocks. This process is known as diapirism. The resulting structures are also referred to as piercement structures. In the process, segments of the existing strata can be disconnected and pushed upwards. While moving higher, they retain many of their original properties, e.g. pressure; their pressure can be significantly different from the pressure of the shallower strata they get pushed into. Such overpressured "floaters" pose a significant risk when trying to drill through them. There is an analogy to a Galilean thermometer.

Rock types such as evaporitic salt deposits, and gas charged muds are potential sources of diapirs. Diapirs also form in the Earth's mantle when a sufficient mass of hot, less dense magma assembles. Diapirism in the mantle is thought to be associated with the development of large igneous provinces and some mantle plumes.

Explosive, hot volatile rich magma or volcanic eruptions are referred to generally as diatremes. Diatremes are not usually associated with diapirs, as they are small-volume magmas which ascend by volatile plumes, not by density contrast with the surrounding mantle.

== Economic importance ==
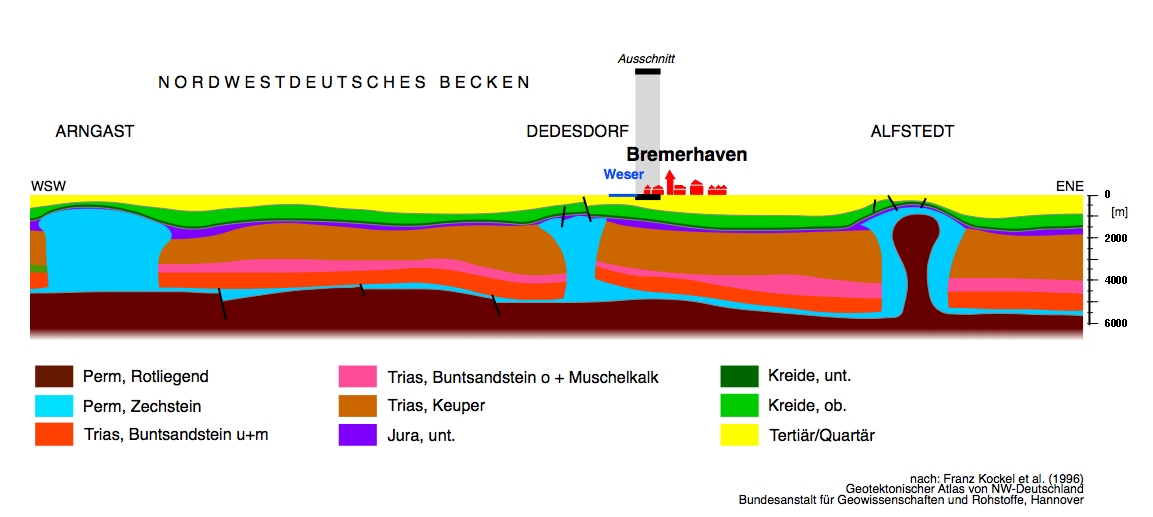
Geological cross section through the Northwestern Basin of Germany (Ostfriesland-Nordheide). Salt domes have penetrated younger layers and moved near to the surface. They sometimes form pockets where petroleum and natural gas can collect. Excavated salt domes are also used for underground storage.

Diapirs or piercement structures are structures resulting from the penetration of overlaying material. By pushing upward and piercing overlying rock layers, diapirs can form anticlines (arch-like shape folds), salt domes (mushroom/dome-shaped diapirs), and other structures capable of trapping hydrocarbons such as petroleum and natural gas. Igneous intrusions themselves are typically too hot to allow the preservation of preexisting hydrocarbons.

== Occurrences ==
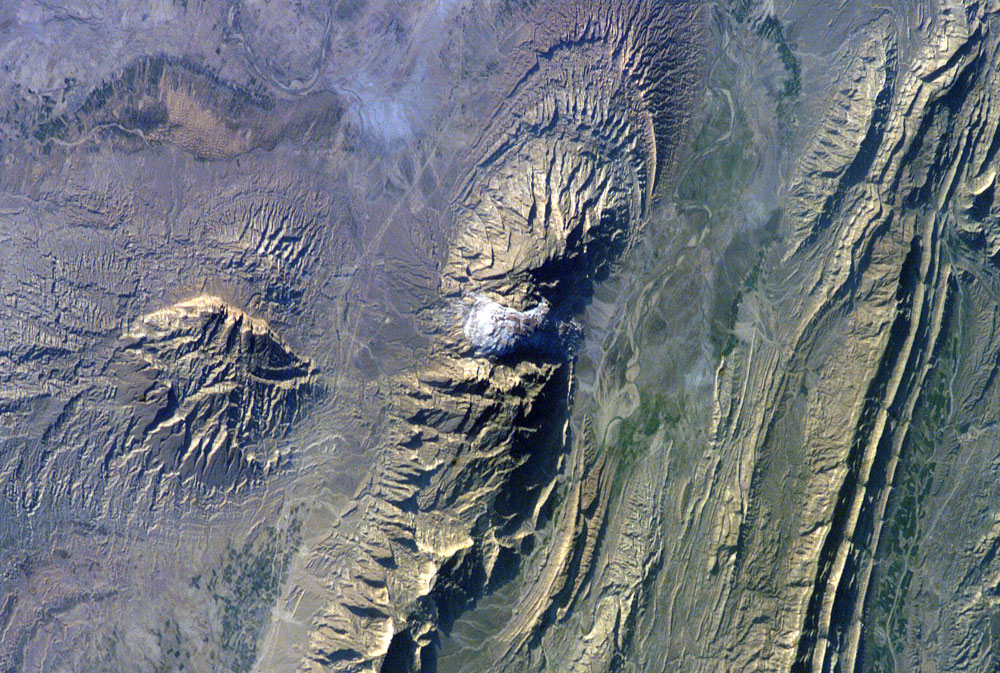
Astronaut photo of the southwestern edge of the Zagros Mountains featuring the Jashak salt dome (white spot in center). Erosion revealed the uplifted tan and brown rock layers surrounding the salt dome to the northwest and southeast (center of image). Radial drainage patterns indicate another salt dome is located to the southwest (image left center).

There are many salt domes and salt glaciers in the Zagros mountains, formed by the collision of two tectonic plates, the Eurasian Plate and the Arabian Plate. There are underwater salt domes in the Gulf of Mexico.

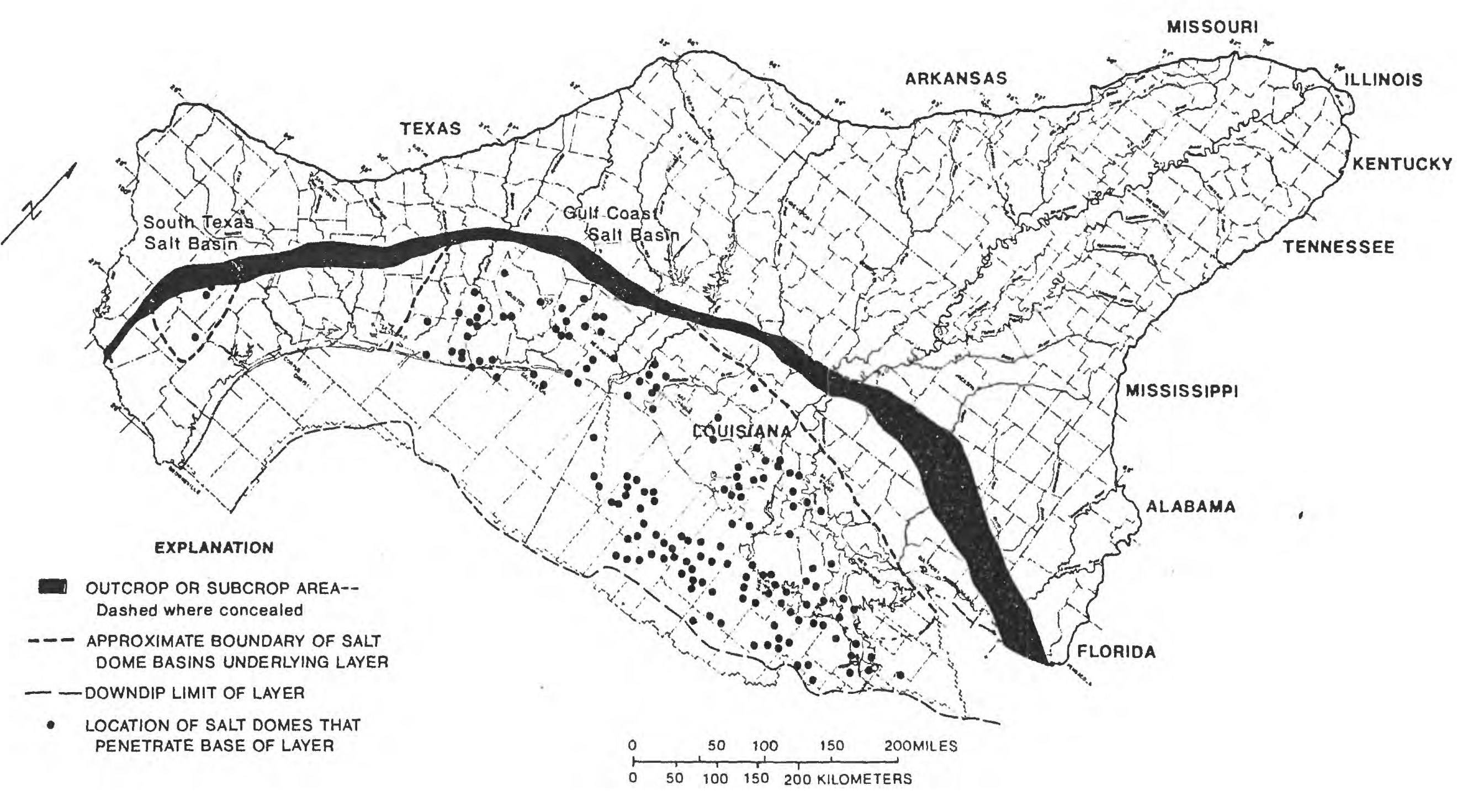
A map of salt domes that penetrate the base of layer 9 (permeable zone C) in the gulf of Mexico off the Louisiana coast.

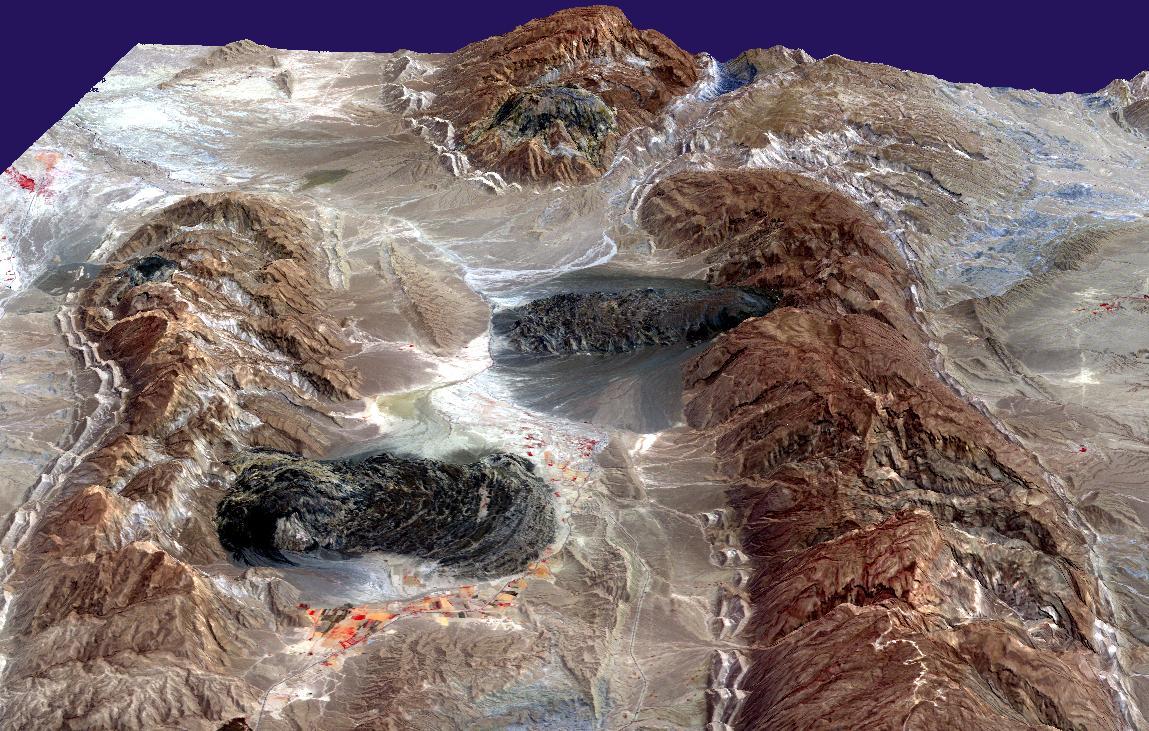
Satellite imagery of salt domes and salt glaciers, visible as darkish irregular patches, Zagros Mountains, southern Iran, near Karmowstaj. Gravity has caused the salt to flow like glaciers into adjacent valleys. The resulting tongue-shaped bodies are more than 5 kilometers long. The darker tones are due to clays brought up with the salt, as well as the probable accumulation of airborne dust.

== See also ==
- Geyser – Natural explosive eruption of hot water
- Methods of pluton emplacement – Accommodation of magma in a host rock
- Mud volcano – Landform created by the eruption of mud or slurries, water, and gases
