= Salt tectonics =

Geology of salt structures

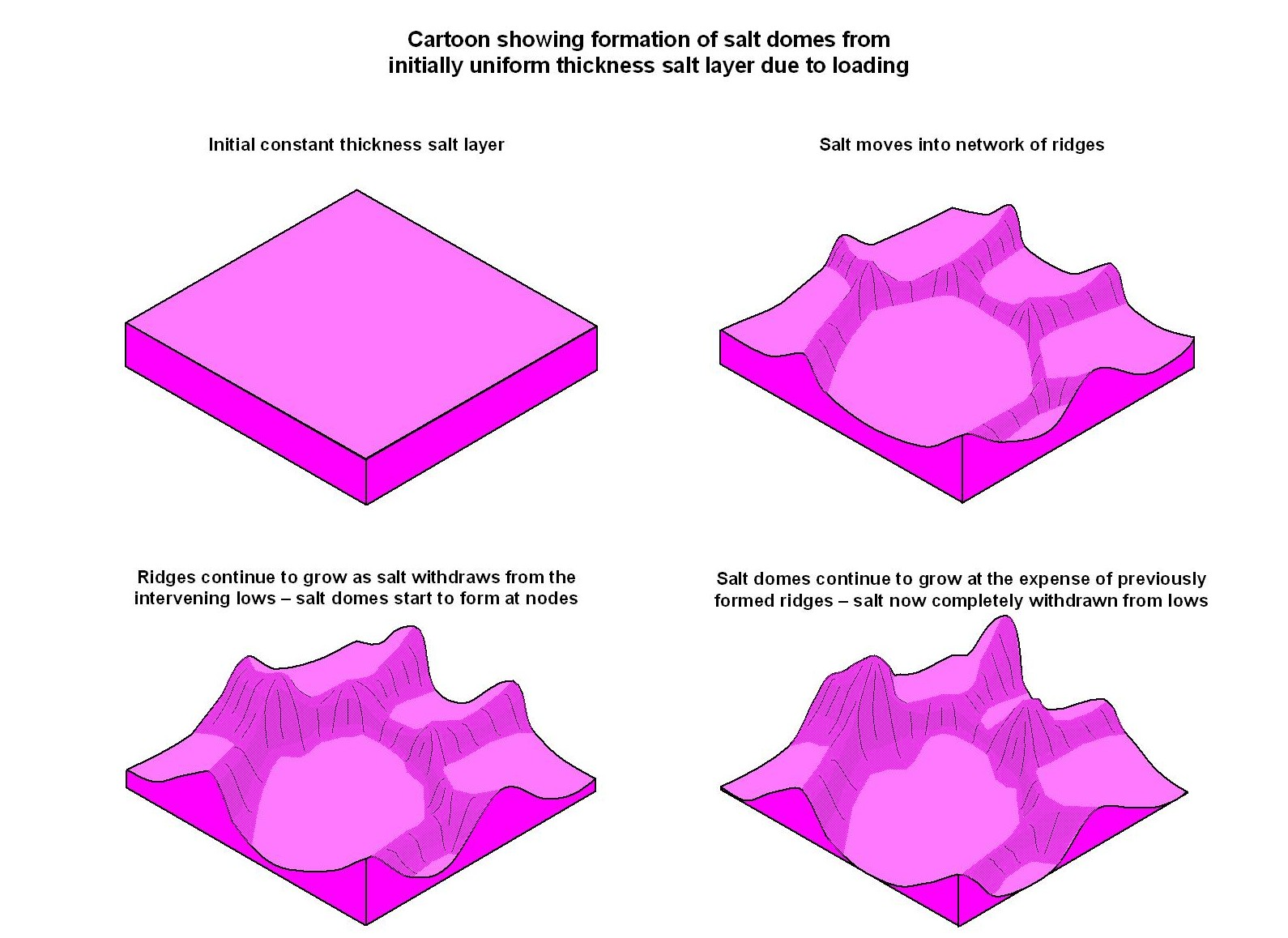

Salt tectonics, or halokinesis, or halotectonics, is concerned with the geometries and processes associated with the presence of significant thicknesses of evaporites containing rock salt within a stratigraphic sequence of rocks. This is due both to the low density of salt, which does not increase with burial, and its low strength.

Salt structures (excluding undeformed layers of salt) have been found in more than 120 sedimentary basins around the world.

== Passive salt structures ==
Structures may form during continued sedimentary loading, without any external tectonic influence, due to gravitational instability. Pure halite has a density of 2160 kg/m^{3}. When initially deposited, sediments generally have a lower density of 2000 kg/m^{3}, but with loading and compaction their density increases to 2500 kg/m^{3}, which is greater than that of salt. Once the overlying layers have become denser, the weak salt layer will tend to deform into a characteristic series of ridges and depressions, due to a form of Rayleigh–Taylor instability. Further sedimentation will be concentrated in the depressions, and the salt will continue to move away from them into the ridges. At a late stage, diapirs tend to initiate at the junctions between ridges, their growth fed by movement of salt along the ridge system, continuing until the salt supply is exhausted. During the later stages of this process, the top of the diapir remains at or near the surface, with further burial being matched by diapir rise, and is sometimes referred to as downbuilding. The Schacht Asse II and Gorleben salt domes in Germany are an example of a purely passive salt structure.

Such structures do not always form when a salt layer is buried beneath a sedimentary overburden. This can be due to a relatively high strength overburden or to the presence of sedimentary layers interbedded within the salt unit that increase both its density and strength.

== Active salt structures ==
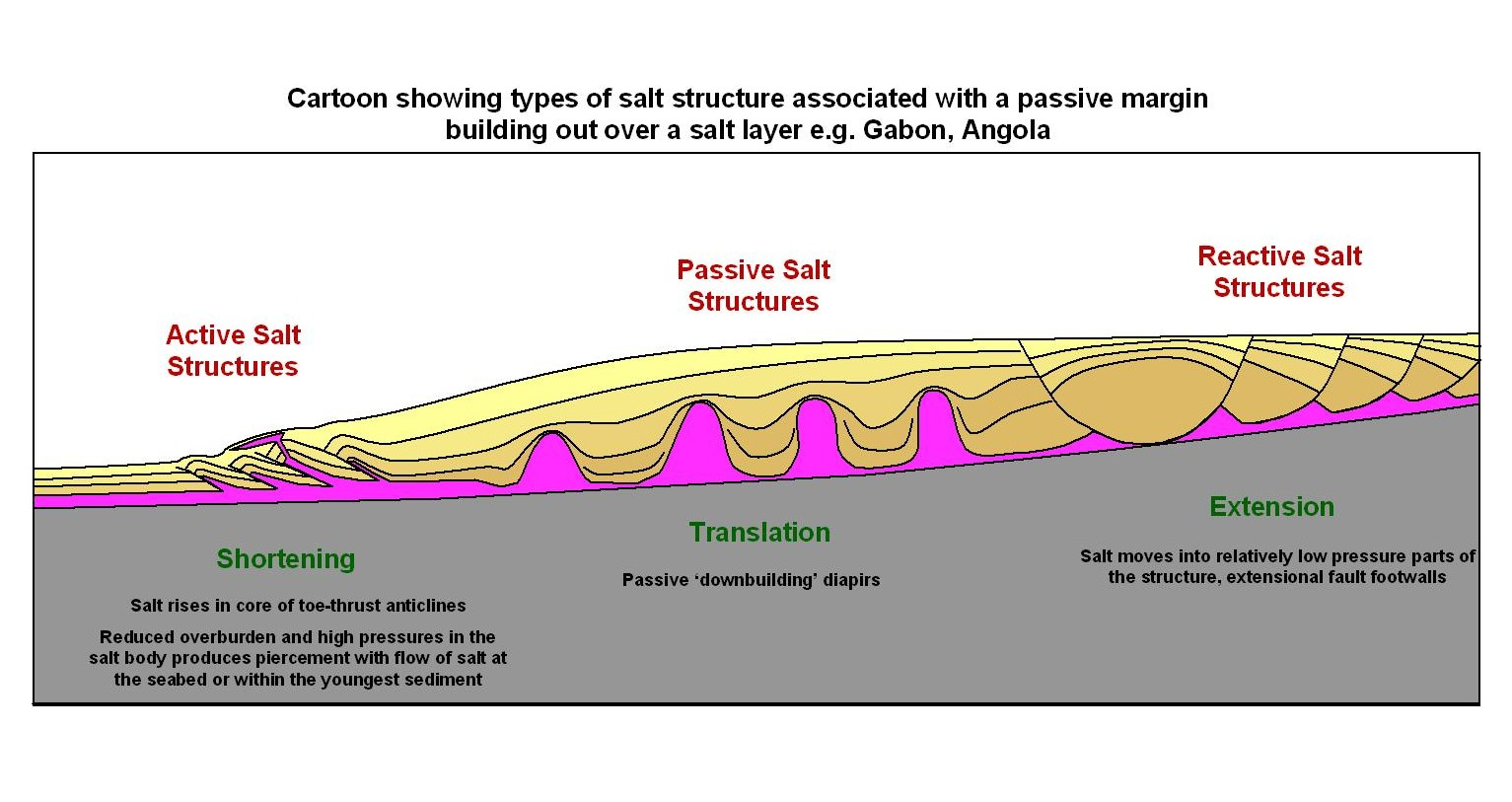

Active tectonics will increase the likelihood of salt structures developing. In the case of extensional tectonics, faulting will both reduce the strength of the overburden and thin it. In an area affected by thrust tectonics, buckling of the overburden layer will allow the salt to rise into the cores of anticlines, as seen in salt domes in the Zagros Mountains and El Gordo diapir (Coahuila fold-and-thrust belt, NE Mexico).

If the pressure within the salt body becomes sufficiently high, it may be able to push through its overburden; this is known as forceful diapirism. Many salt diapirs may contain elements of both active and passive salt movement. An active salt structure may pierce its overburden and from then on continue to develop as a purely passive salt diapir.

== Reactive salt structures ==
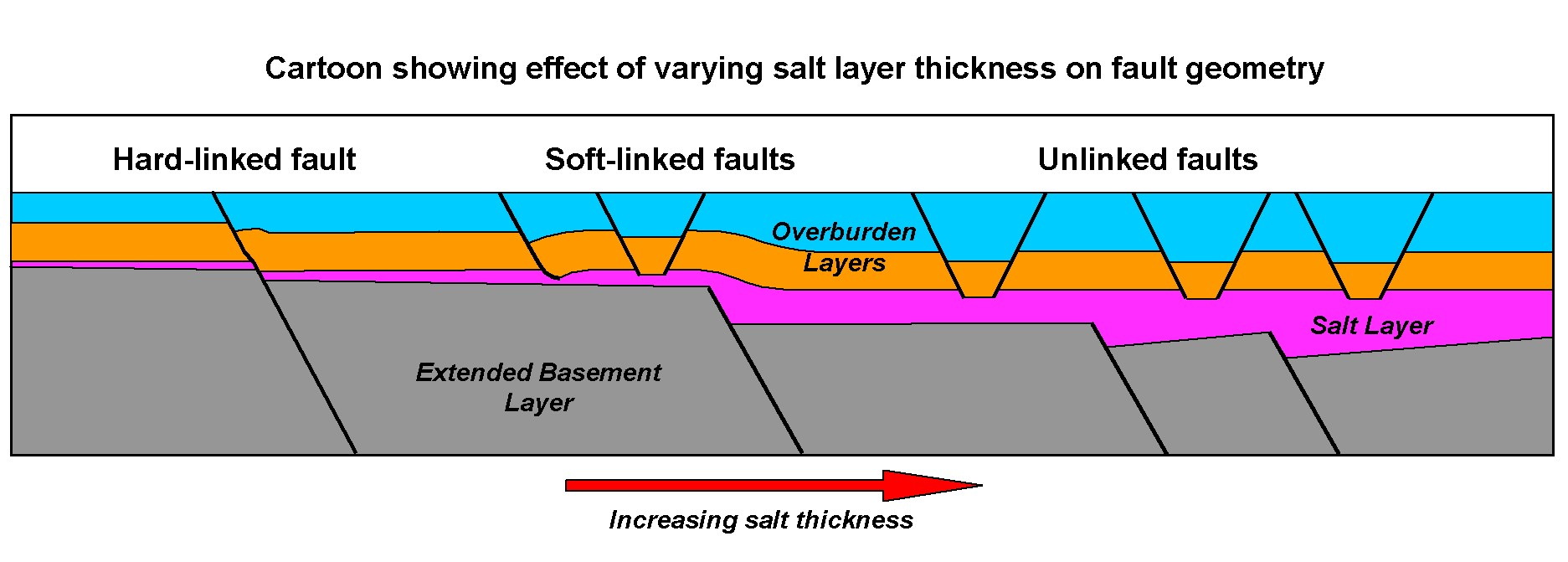

In those cases where salt layers do not have the conditions necessary to develop passive salt structures, the salt may still move into relatively low-pressure areas around developing folds and faults. Such structures are described as reactive.

== Salt detached fault systems ==
When one or more salt layers are present during extensional tectonics, a characteristic set of structures is formed. Extensional faults propagate up from the middle part of the crust until they encounter the salt layer. The weakness of the salt prevents the fault from propagating through. However, continuing displacement on the fault offsets the base of the salt and causes bending of the overburden layer. Eventually, the stresses caused by this bending will be sufficient to fault the overburden. The types of structures developed depend on the initial salt thickness. In the case of a very thick salt layer, there is no direct spatial relationship between the faulting beneath the salt and that in the overburden; such a system is said to be unlinked. For intermediate salt thicknesses, the overburden faults are spatially related to the deeper faults, but offset from them, normally into the footwall; these are known as soft-linked systems. When the salt layer becomes thin enough, the fault that develops in the overburden is closely aligned with that beneath the salt, and forms a continuous fault surface after only a relatively small displacement, forming a hard-linked fault.

In areas of thrust tectonics, salt layers act as preferred detachment planes. In the Zagros fold and thrust belt, variations in the thickness and therefore effectiveness of the late Neoproterozoic to Early Cambrian Hormuz salt are thought to have had a fundamental control on the overall topography.

== Salt weld ==
When a salt layer becomes too thin to be an effective detachment layer, due to salt movement, dissolution or removal by faulting, the overburden and the underlying sub-salt basement become effectively welded together. This may cause the development of new faults in the cover sequence and is an important consideration when modelling the migration of hydrocarbons. Salt welds may also develop in the vertical direction by putting the sides of a former diapir in contact.

== Allochthonous salt structures ==
Salt that pierces to the surface, either on land or beneath the sea, tends to spread laterally away and such salt is said to be "allochthonous". Salt glaciers are formed on land where this happens in an arid environment, such as in the Zagros Mountains. Offshore tongues of salt are generated that may join together with others from neighbouring piercements to form canopies.

== Effects on sedimentary systems ==
On passive margins where salt is present, such as the Gulf of Mexico, salt tectonics largely control the evolution of deep-water sedimentary systems; for example submarine channels, as modern and ancient case studies show.

== Economic importance ==
A significant proportion of the world's hydrocarbon reserves are found in structures related to salt tectonics, including many in the Middle East, the South Atlantic passive margins (Brazil, Gabon and Angola), the Gulf of Mexico, and the Pricaspian Basin.

== See also ==
- Plasticity (physics) – Non-reversible deformation of a solid material in response to applied forces
