= Salt glacier =

Flow of solid salt on Earth's surface

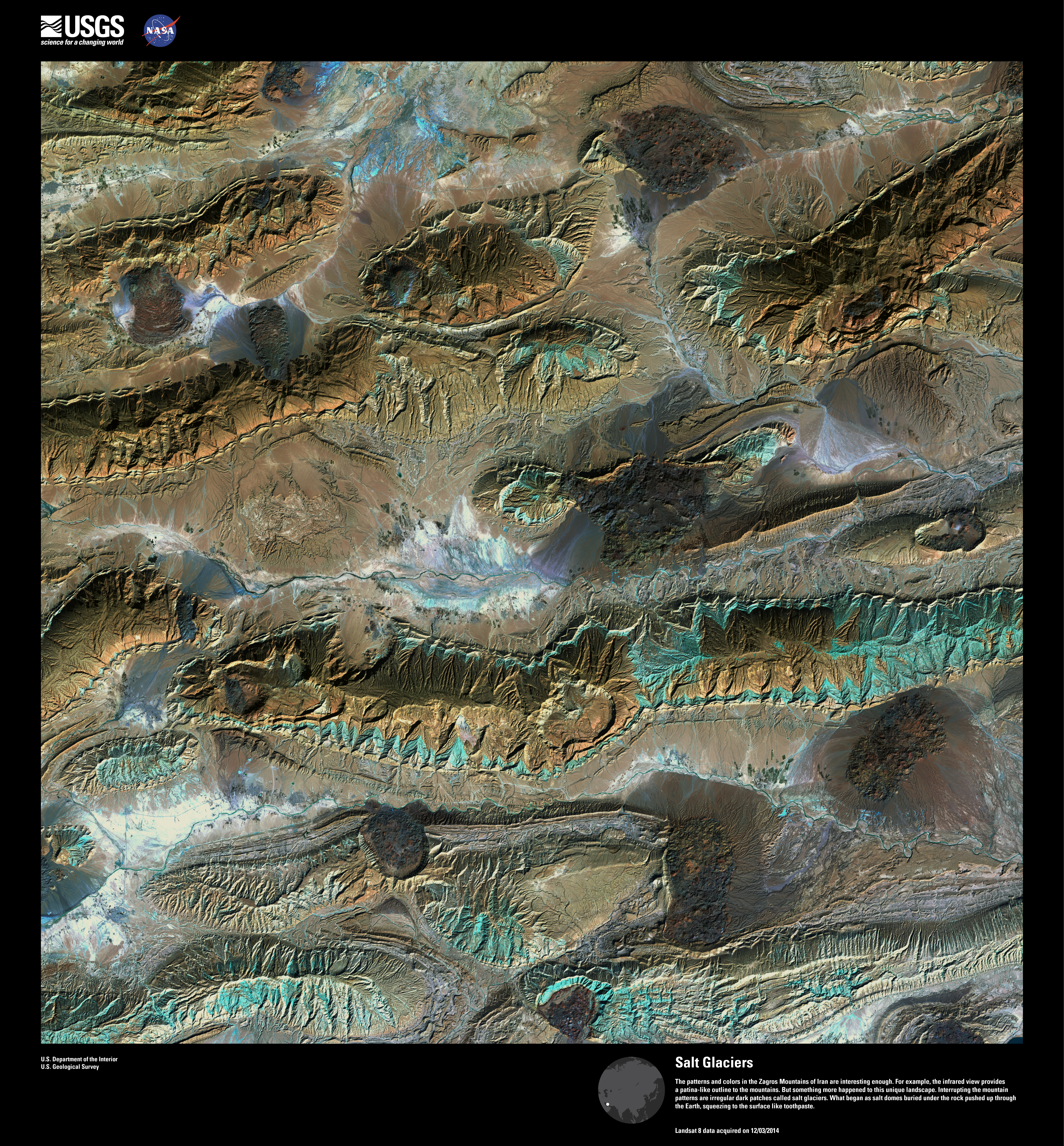
The irregular dark patches are the salt glaciers. Satellite image of the Zagros Mountains.

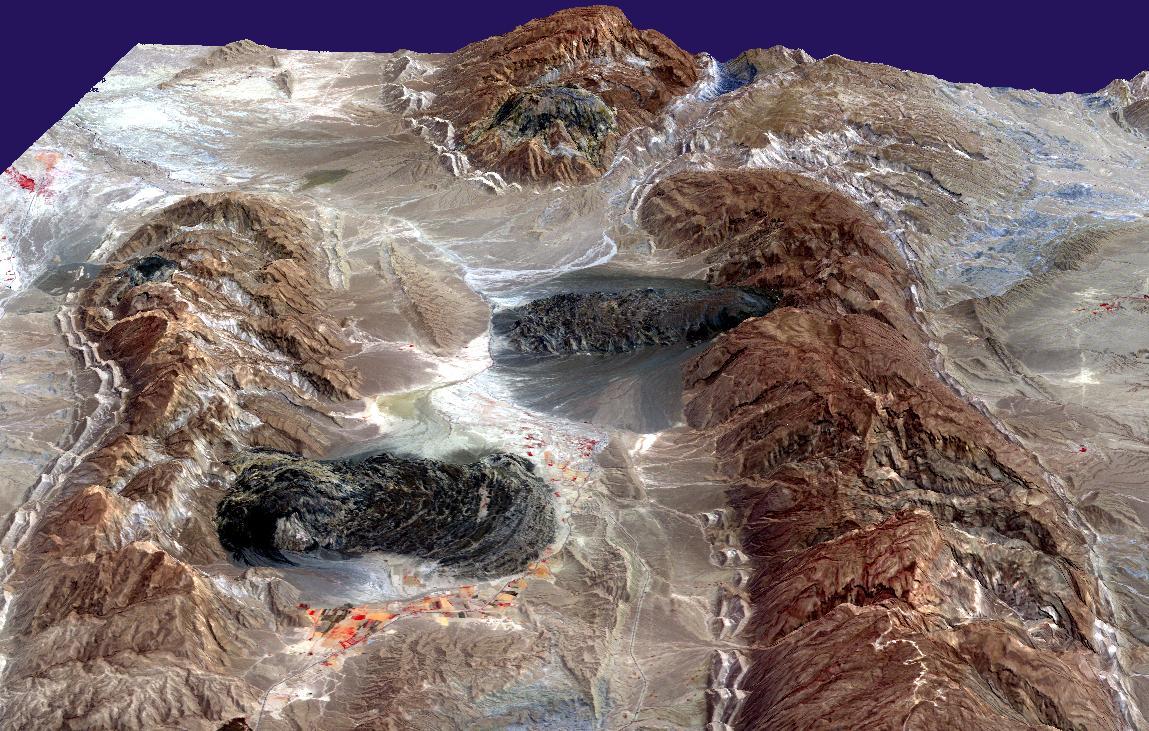
Salt domes (hills) and salt glaciers (dark areas) in the Zagros Mountains of southern Iran

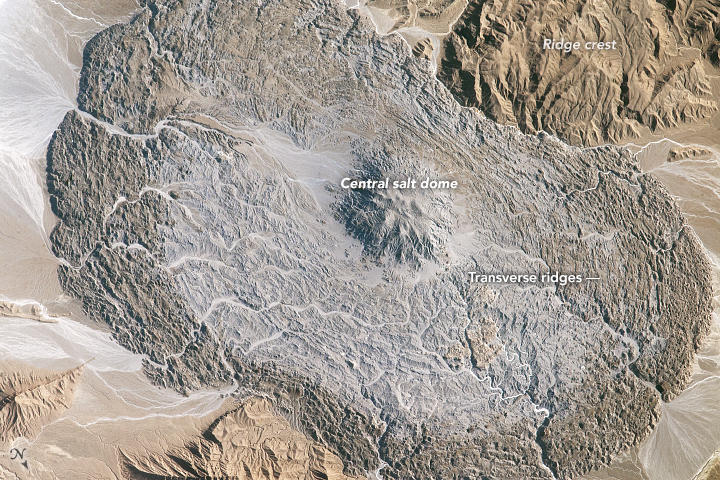
ISS image of an oval-shaped salt glacier, about 14 km (8 mi) across, in the Zagros Mountains. Note north arrow pointing towards lower right.

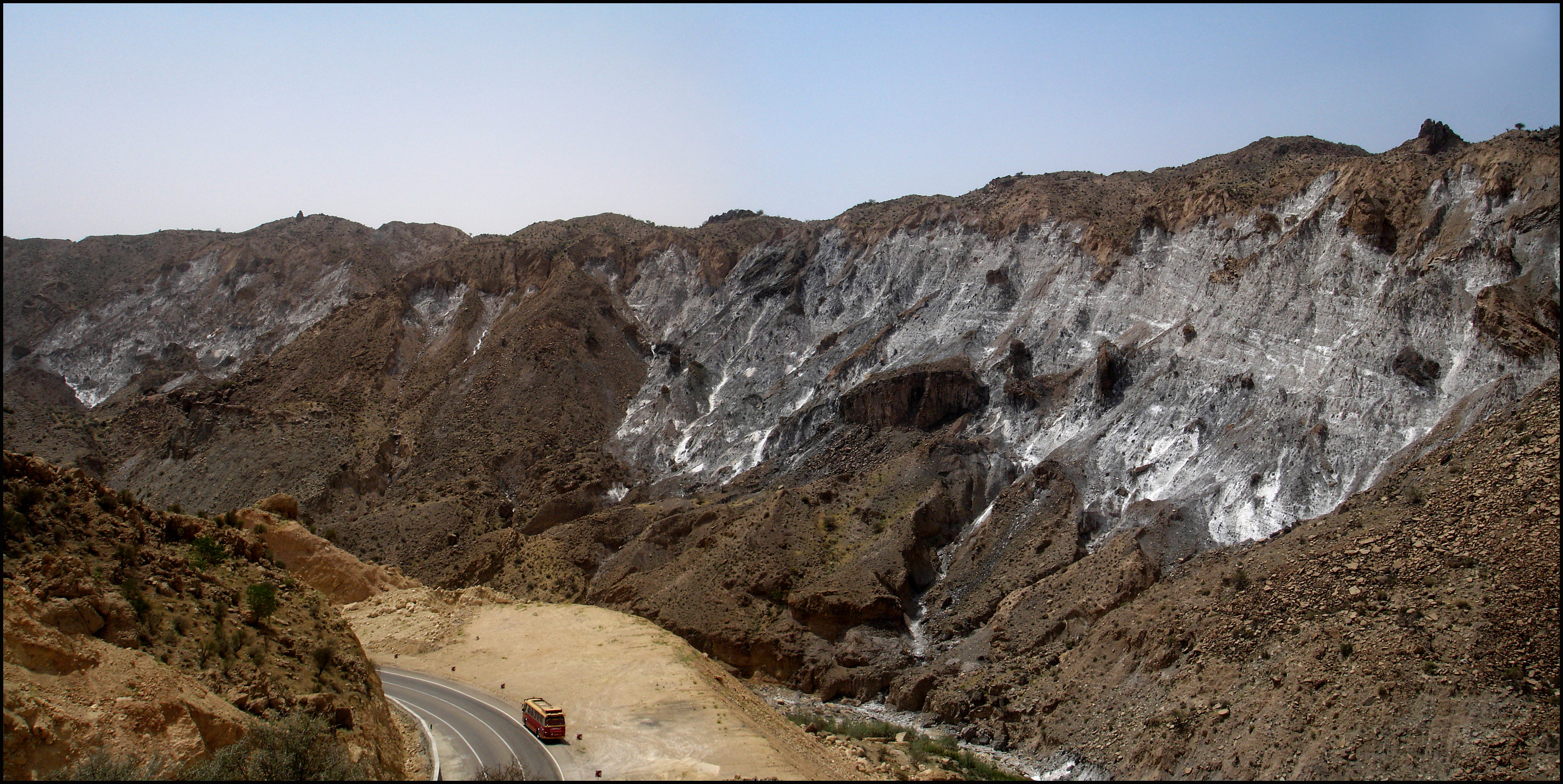
Konar Siyah Salt dome, Hadi Karimi, Iran

A salt glacier (or namakier) is a rare flow of rock salt that is created when a rising diapir in a salt dome breaches the surface of Earth. The name ‘salt glacier’ was given to this phenomenon because of the similarity of movement compared to ice glaciers. These formations are primarily due to salt's unique properties and its surrounding geologic environment. A diapir, a rising body of salt, reaches the surface and feeds the salt glacier. Salt structures are usually composed of halite, anhydrite, gypsum and clay minerals. Clays may be brought up with the salt, turning it dark. These salt flows are rare on Earth. Scientists have discovered diapirs on Mars, but they are composed of sulfates. A paper published in November 2023 suggests that salt glaciers composed of halite might also be present on Mercury.

The salt glaciers of the Zagros Mountains in Iran are halite, whereas the salt glacier of Lüneburg Kalkberg, Germany, is composed of gypsum and carbonate minerals.

Ancient flows have been preserved in various rock records by sedimentation. Late Triassic salt glaciers repeatedly flowed onto a basin in Germany and were buried with sediment to create a series of preserved glaciers. Miocene glaciers flowed into sheets in the northern Gulf of Mexico and were similarly preserved by overriding sediment.

== Formation and causes ==
The sources of salt glaciers are salt deposits. Over time, sediments, rock and debris cover the deposit, causing layers to build up over the salt. Because of its crystalline structure, salt remains at the same density while the sediment above begins to compress and become denser. The density contrast is the mechanism in which salt begins to rise. Diapirs rise and pierce the surface, allowing the salt to flow because of gravity.

Piercing the overburden is crucial for salt glaciers to form, and can occur in three ways. Active diapirism develops as the rising salt itself pushes and forces the overburden upward and sideways. Passive diapirism occurs when the salt always remains near the surface and the sediment builds up around it rather than over it. Reactive diapirism is the result of regional extension caused by rifting. The overburden becomes weak and thin, which allows the salt body to travel upwards.

Salt glaciers are a frequent topic in salt tectonics, the study of salt causing deformation, and its leading cause is differential loading (an unevenly distributed load). Differential loading can be caused by displacement, gravitational and thermal gradients. Other tectonics may cause salt deposit uplift. The strength of the overburden and drag of the salt deposit boundary are the two factors that will slow and prevent salt flow and it will only move if the salt forces exceed the resistant forces.

== Structure and movement ==
The structure of a salt glacier is much like that of an ice glacier. Salt glaciers on average may only advance a few meters per year. Salt will continue to flow on the surface if sedimentation, erosion and disintegration rates are slow and thus will have little impact. Salt glaciers move faster as precipitation increases; however too much precipitation may dissolve the salt. Salt glaciers may also leave behind features such as moraines.

== Geography ==
Salt glaciers are mostly found in arid areas, where they will be preserved because of the dry climatic conditions. Southern Iran hosts the majority of salt glaciers and the most active salt glacier in the world. The Kuh-e-Namak salt glacier is in southeast Iran. It comprises two salt glaciers; the larger is 50–100 m thick and 3,000 m long. The summit of the feature is around 1,600 m above sea level.

== Significance ==
Salt glaciers provide observable and tangible evidence demonstrating salt movement that allows scientists to further understand movement beneath Earth's surface. New studies of salt glaciers can help improve the understanding of salt tectonic mechanisms and how they influence the surrounding landscape. Salt structures often have petroleum traps, which contain much of the oil in use today. The traps are also being studied to serve as potential storage vessels for waste and fuels.

== See also ==
- Salt surface structures
