= Helvetic (geology) =

The Helvetic zone, Helvetic system or the Helveticum is a geologic subdivision of the Alps. The Helvetic zone crops out mainly in Switzerland, hence the name (derived from Helveticus: Latin for Swiss). Rocks in the Helvetic zone are sedimentary and were originally deposited at the southern margin of the European plate. The Helvetic zone correlates with the French Dauphinois zone, French geologists often prefer the French name but normally this is considered the same thing.

== Occurrence ==
In Switzerland the Helvetic zone is found in outcrops on the northern side of the Alpine mountain ranges. The French Alps consist mainly of Helvetic (Dauphinois) material. In Germany and Austria the Helvetic nappes crop out as a narrow band.

== Subdivision ==
The Helvetic zone consists of a number of tectonically very different units. The "Helvetic nappes" are a nappe stack that was thrust over the molasse of the Molasse basin in the Alpine foreland. They are composed of Mesozoic marine limestone, marls and shales. The Helvetic nappes are completely detached from their former basement.

The Helvetic nappes are thrust over the "Infrahelvetic complex" in eastern Switzerland. The Infrahelvetic complex is composed of autochthonous Mesozoic sediments on top of Hercynian basement rock. The Mesozoic of this unit is contemporary with that of the Helvetic nappes, but deposited further north on the former continental slope and therefore shallower in sedimentary facies. The Infrahelvetic is internally deformed by thrusting and folding that continues into the Hercynian basement. Because basement and "cover" were not detached, geologists do not call the Infrahelvetic units "nappes".

At places throughout the Alps the European basement was, after being detached of its cover rocks, tectonically uplifted in a late stage of the orogeny. Thus the "external massives" were formed, places where the Hercynian basement rock crops out in large anticlinoria at the southern (or in France eastern) side of the Helvetic zone. Seen from the north (or in France from the west) the hard competent crystalline rocks of these external massifs form the first of the higher ranges of the Alps. These chains are (from southwest to northeast): the Mercantour, the Massif des Écrins, the Belledonne, the Aiguilles Rouges and the Mont Blanc Massif, the Aarmassif and the Gotthardmassif.

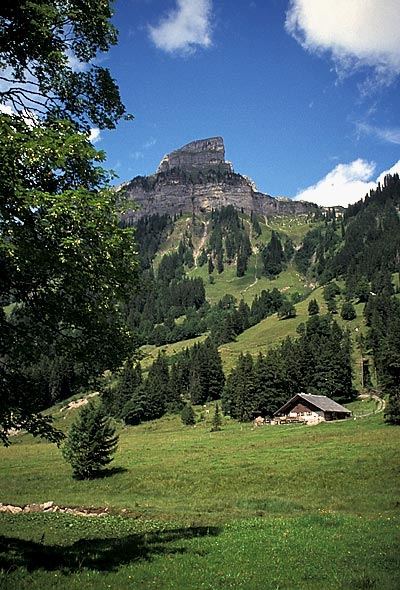
Sigriswiler Rothorn in the Emmental Alps
