= External massif =

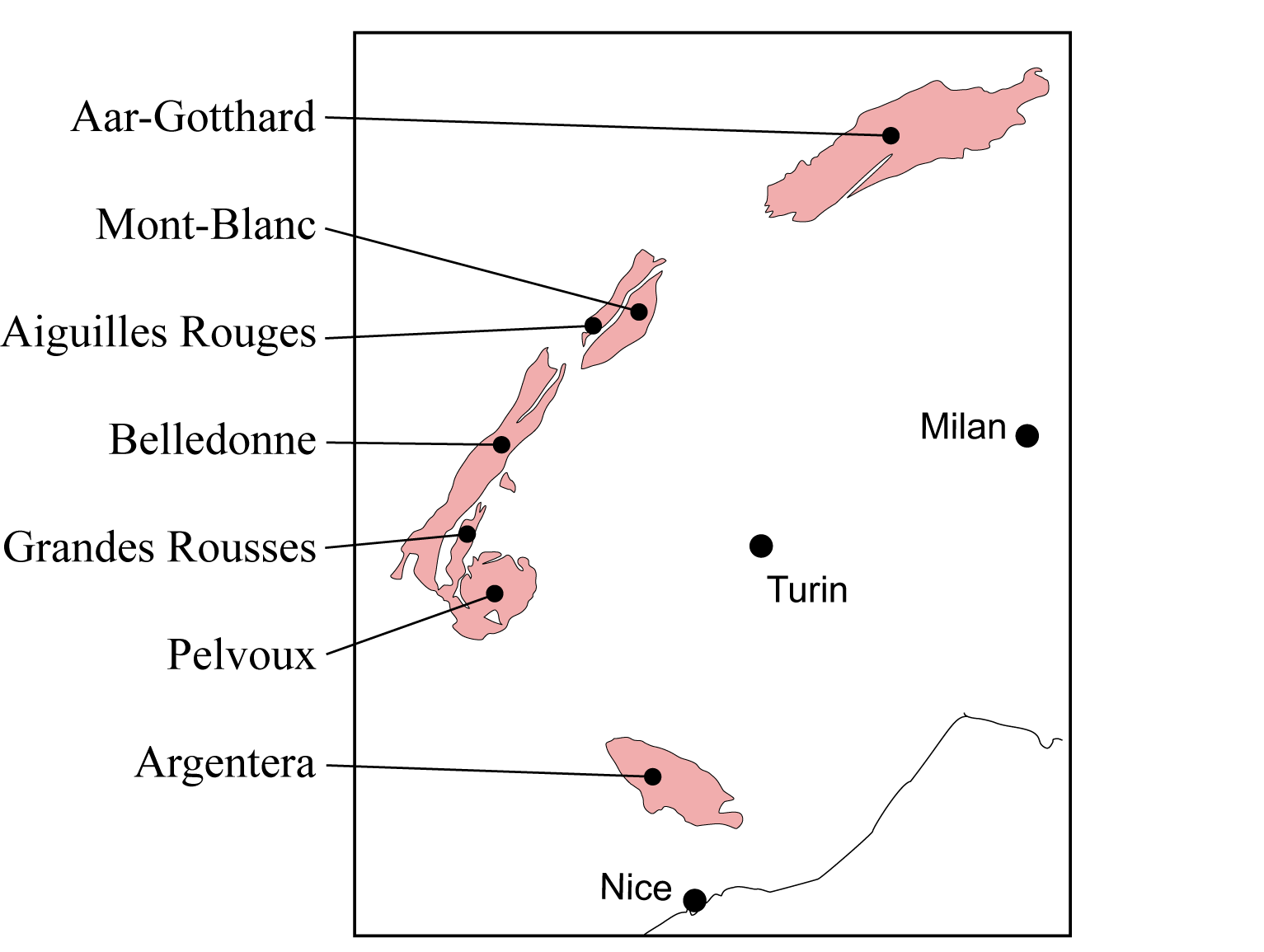
Location of the external massifs of the Alps

An external massif is, in the geology of the Alps, a place where crystalline rocks of the European plate crop out. Such massifs are found north and west of the Penninic zone (the crystalline "core" of the Alps) as tectonic windows in the Helvetic Zone. They differ from the crystalline nappes in that they were originally part of the European plate, while the Penninic nappes were part of the crust below various domains in the Tethys Ocean.

The external massifs are the Argentera in the Alpes Maritimes, the Pelvoux massif and the Belledonne range in the Dauphiné part of the French Alps, the Aiguilles Rouges in the Savoy part of the French Alps, the Mont Blanc Massif at the borders between France, Italy and Switzerland and the Aarmassif and Gotthardmassif in the Central Alps of Switzerland.

The massifs are composed of the basement of the former margin of the European plate, consisting of metamorphic and igneous rocks of Hercynian age or older. The Mesozoic cover that was originally on top of these rock has mostly been detached by thin skinned thrusting about 40 to 25 million years ago (Ma). At some places along the Aarmassif, the Mesozoic cover is partly still lying conformally on top of the Hercynian basement rock, this Mesozoic is called the Infrahelvetic complex. The uplift that brought the massifs to the surface involved thick skinned thrusting (the style of thrusting in which the basement is itself involved) and took place in a tectonic phase beginning around 19 million years ago.
