= 1901 Black Sea earthquake =

Earthquake struck Dobrich Province, Bulgaria on March 31, 1901

Coordinates: 43°24′N 28°42′E

- Location within Bulgaria
- UTC time: 1901-03-31 07:12:24
- ISC event: n/a
- USGS-ANSS: n/a
- Local date: March 31, 1901
- Local time: 09:12:24
- Magnitude: 7.2 M_{w}
- Depth: 14 km (9 mi)
- Areas affected: Romania; Bulgaria
- Total damage: 1,200 houses destroyed
- Max. intensity: MMI X (Extreme)
- Tsunami: 4–5 m
- Landslides: Yes
- Aftershocks: 5 M_{w} (at 11:30 local time)
- Casualties: uncertain

The 1901 Black Sea earthquake (also known in Bulgaria as the Balchik earthquake) was a 7.2 magnitude earthquake, the most powerful earthquake ever recorded in the Black Sea. The earthquake epicenter was located in the east of Cape Kaliakra, 30 kilometres (19 mi) off northeast coast of Bulgaria. The mainshock occurred at a depth of 15 km (9.3 mi) and generated a 4–5-metre (13–16 ft) high tsunami that devastated the coastal areas of Romania and Bulgaria. In Romania, the earthquake was felt not only throughout Northern Dobruja, but also in Oltenia and Muntenia, and even in southern Moldova.

The earthquake was followed by a large number of aftershocks, which continued until 1905; the strongest reached magnitudes of 5.5–6.0 on the Richter scale and were also felt in southern Romania, including Bucharest. After 1905, Pontic seismic activity began to subside, although weak and moderate earthquakes were also reported in subsequent years.

Such events are rare in the Black Sea. In the last 200 years, in the Black Sea region 24 tsunamis occurred, of which two were in the territory of Dobruja. The earliest recorded tsunami in Romania dates from 104, when the city of Callatis, current Mangalia, was badly affected.

== Tectonic setting ==
The northernmost part of Bulgaria lies to the north of the main part of the fold and thrust belt that forms the frontal part of the Alpine orogenic belt, known as the Balkan orogen. The foreland to the Alpine belt is known as the Moesian Platform that remained almost undeformed during the three main separate phases of thrust tectonics from the Cretaceous to the Neogene. The Balkan orogen links to the southeast with the Pontide belt, which runs along the northern coast of Turkey. The Black Sea opened as a back arc basin during the Cretaceous to Paleocene. The basin was then inverted during the last phase of the Alpine orogeny during the Late Eocene to Miocene.

Offshore, the main west–east trending structures are cut by several fault zones of SSW-NNE to SW-NE trend. Geophysical investigations close to Shabla have identified a major fault zone of this trend, known as the Kaliakra Fault Zone, that continues southwards until it links with the north–south trending part of the Balkan-Pontide belt in the southwestern Black Sea.

== Seismicity ==
The off-shore region of Southern Dobruja, especially the epicentral area located to the south of Mangalia, including the Bulgarian shelf of the Black Sea, has been affected over the years by earthquakes that, in certain cases, have been very strong, reaching magnitudes of 7–7.5 on the Richter scale. These are also shallow (5–30 kilometres (3.1–18.6 mi)) crustal earthquakes, with severe effects in the epicentral areas. Sometimes, in case of earthquakes with underwater focus (as those located to the east of Shabla Cape), tsunami waves were generated, like in 1901.

The analysis of historical records has shown that Pontic earthquakes with destructive behaviour, comparable to that in 1901, repeat at mean periods of 300–500 years. One of the earliest occurred in the 1st century BC at Kavarna. In AD 853, a tsunami at Varna swept 6.5 kilometres (4.0 mi) inland over flat coastal plain and travelled 30 kilometres (19 mi) up a river.

== Earthquake ==
The earthquake had an estimated magnitude of about 7.2 M_{w}, with magnitudes of 7.1, 6.5 and 6.4 also being reported. The maximum observed intensity was X (Devastating) on the Medvedev–Sponheuer–Karnik scale at Cape Shabla with much of northeastern Bulgaria reaching at least VII (Very Strong).

== Impact ==
=== Felt area ===
The shock was felt throughout Bulgaria, southeast Romania, eastern Serbia and northwest Anatolia, causing great panic in Istanbul and on the Asiatic coast of the Bosphorus and the Marmara. Long period effects lasting about a minute were reported from the Danube valley, from Szeged in Hungary, and from Odessa. The shock was perceptible in Thessaloniki in Macedonia, in Dorohoi in Romania, and throughout the province of Sivas.

=== Damage ===
The earthquake had devastating consequences in the coastal area of southern Mangalia, many villages being ruined (maximum intensity of X on the Mercalli intensity scale); likewise, the earthquake generated a 4–5 metres (13–16 ft) high tsunami wave and there occurred bank dislocations and other local geomorphological phenomena. Maximum damage was sustained by a small number of villages situated on the alluvial lowlands along the coast between Balchik, Kavarna, Durankulak and Limanu. Slumping of the coast destroyed many landing-places and coastal settlements including the lighthouse at Kaliakra. Large scale landslides along the coast continued to develop for almost two weeks after the earthquake, disrupting communications and causing additional damage. In Bucharest, the seismic intensity was V–VI degrees on the Mercalli intensity scale, causing panic among the population and light damage to buildings.

The Bulgarian province of Dobrich was also severely hit by the tsunami. In several localities, including Balchik, homes were inundated by water. In the village of Momchil, a large landslide buried people's homes over an area of about 30 hectares (74 acres).

== See also ==
- List of earthquakes in 1901
- List of earthquakes in Bulgaria
- List of earthquakes in Romania
