= Thrust tectonics =

Concept in structural geology

Cross-section diagram of the frontal part of a thin-skinned thrust zone

Thrust tectonics or contractional tectonics is concerned with the structures formed by, and the tectonic processes associated with, the shortening and thickening of the crust or lithosphere. It is one of the three main types of tectonic regime, the others being extensional tectonics and strike-slip tectonics. These match the three types of plate boundary, convergent (thrust), divergent (extensional) and transform (strike-slip). There are two main types of thrust tectonics, thin-skinned and thick-skinned, depending on whether or not basement rocks are involved in the deformation. The principle geological environments where thrust tectonics is observed are zones of continental collision, restraining bends on strike-slip faults and as part of detached fault systems on some passive margins.

== Deformation styles ==
In areas of thrust tectonics, two main processes are recognized: thin-skinned deformation and thick-skinned deformation. The distinction is important as attempts to structurally restore the deformation will give very different results depending on the assumed geometry.

=== Thin-skinned deformation ===
Thin-skinned deformation refers to shortening that only involves the sedimentary cover. This style is typical of many fold and thrust belts developed in the foreland of a collisional zone. This is particularly the case where a good basal decollement exists such as salt or a zone of high pore fluid pressure.

=== Thick-skinned deformation ===
Thick-skinned deformation refers to shortening that involves basement rocks rather than just the overlying cover. This type of geometry is typically found in the hinterland of a collisional zone. This style may also occur in the foreland where no effective decollement surface is present or where pre-existing extensional rift structures may be inverted.

=== In-sequence thrusting ===
In-sequence thrusting is when younger thrusts develop progressively towards the foreland, away from the already deformed orogenic belts. The younger faults break underneath previous thrust sheets towards the undeformed basins. Break-back thrusting is another type of in-sequence thrusting. After a thrust develop towards the foreland, a younger thrust develop above and hindward of it. Subsequent younger thrusts develop further hindward into the hinterland.

Forelandward-developing thrust systems have been adopted as the typical deformation style in thrust tectonics. Break-back thrusting was previously classified under out-of-sequence thrusting. The current scientific vernacular has reconsidered it in-sequence thrusting.

=== Out-of-sequence thrusting ===
Out-of-sequence thrusting occurs when thrust deformation develops behind the active deformation front, violating the in-sequence thrusting principle. It involves reactivation of an old thrust that had formed in-sequence. Out-of-sequence thrusting can also occur concurrently with a predominantly foreland-propagating thrust such as in central Nepal where active thrusting has been observed about 100 km (62 mi) hindward of the thrust front.

It can also involve development of a new thrust fault within already deformed regions. All thrust deformation that occur behind the deformation front is considered out-of-sequence thrusting; including the development or reactivation of one or more thrust.

Out-of-sequence thrust propagation may be the result of; a prolonged hiatus and associated erosion between two phases of thrusting in a multi-phase thrust belt, the development of thick-skinned thrusting on a reactivated basement fault after an earlier thin-skinned thrust belt has formed above it, a change in the presence or effectiveness along a basal detachment surface.

== Geological environments associated with thrust tectonics ==
=== Collisional zones ===
The most significant areas of thrust tectonics are associated with destructive plate boundaries leading to the formation of orogenic belts. The two main types are: the collision of two continental tectonic plates (for example the Arabian plate and Eurasian plate, which formed the Zagros fold and thrust belt) and collisions between a continent and an island arc such as that which formed Taiwan.

=== Restraining bends on strike-slip faults ===
When a strike-slip fault is offset along strike such that the resulting bend in the fault hinders easy movement, e.g. a right stepping bend on a sinistral (left-lateral) fault, this will cause local shortening or transpression. Examples include the 'Big Bend' region of the San Andreas Fault, and parts of the Dead Sea Transform.

=== Passive margins ===
Passive margins are characterised by large prisms of sedimentary material deposited since the original break-up of a continent associated with formation of a new spreading centre. This wedge of material will tend to spread under gravity and, where an effective detachment layer is present such as salt, the extensional faulting that forms at the landward side will be balanced at the front of the wedge by a series of toe-thrusts. Examples include the outboard part of the Niger delta (with an overpressured mudstone detachment) and the Angola margin (with a salt detachment).
