= Infrahelvetic complex =

The Infrahelvetic complex is a tectonic unit in the Swiss Alps. It consists of autochthonous rocks of the former southern continental margin of the European Plate.

The Infrahelvetic complex has been overthrusted by the Helvetic nappes, that partly contain similar rocks. It crops out in the northern part of the canton of Graubünden, generally south and below the Helvetic nappes and north of the Penninic nappes.

The Infrahelvetic complex consists of Mesozoic cover rocks, most notably massive limestones from the European continental shelf. These limestones have a shallower marine facies than contemporary sediments from the Helvetic nappes since they were originally deposited north of those units. The Triassic and Permian consist of dolomites, marls and conglomerates. In contrast to the completely detached Helvetic nappes, the Infrahelvetic complex is still lying conformably on top of a Hercynian basement which forms the external massifs of the Aar and Gotthard nappes.
