= Gotthard nappe =

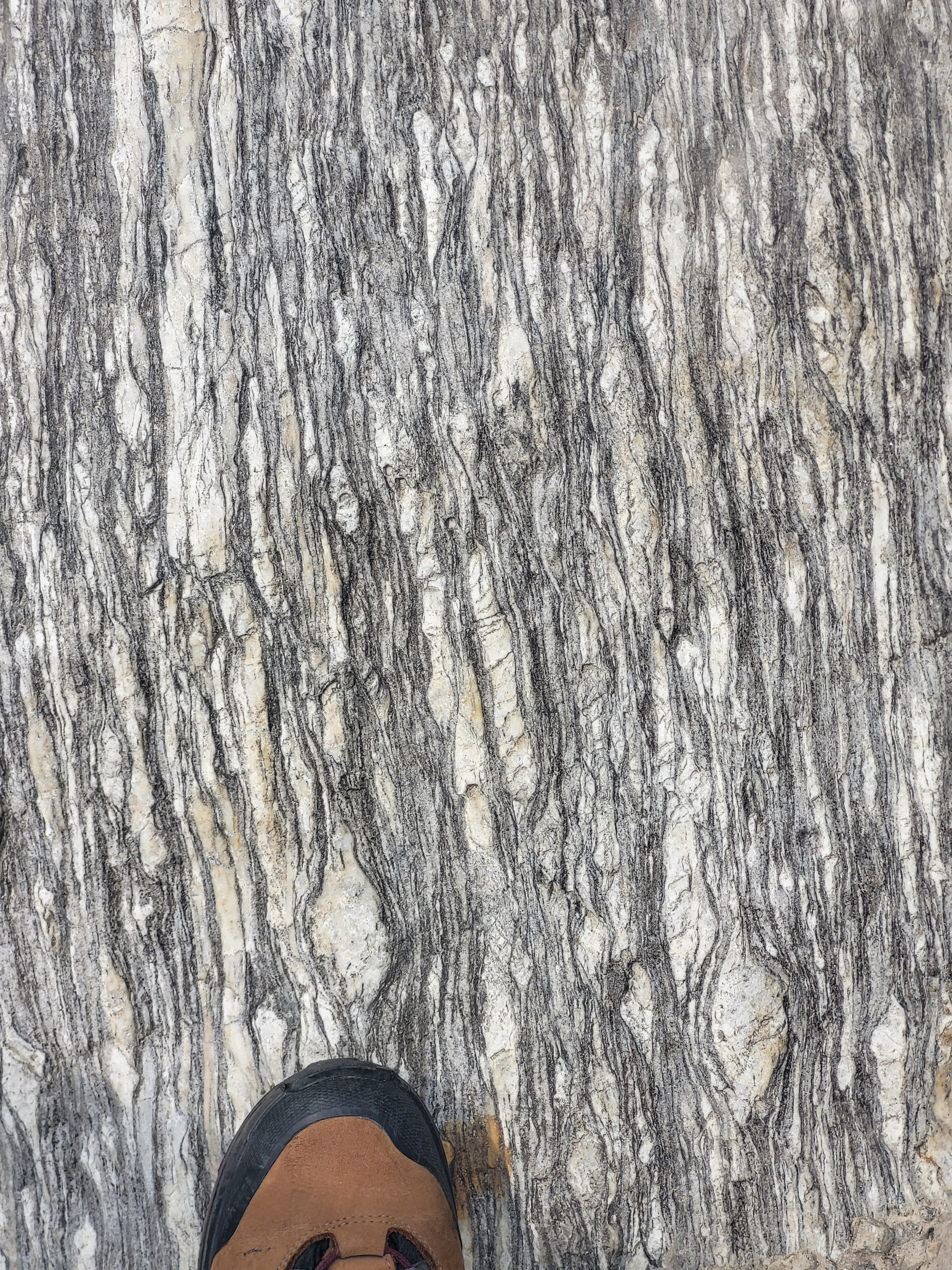
Outcrop of Streifengneis

The Gotthard nappe (German: Gotthard-Decke, in older literature called the Gotthard Massif) is, in the geology of the Alps a nappe in the Helvetic zone of Switzerland. It consists of crystalline rocks that were, before the formation of the Alps, part of the upper crust of the southern margin of the European continent (the northern margin of the Alpine Tethys Ocean). As it names suggests, the Gotthard nappe lies near the Gotthard Massif.

== Position and outcrops ==
The Gotthard nappe is found south of its larger neighbour, the Aarmassif. The two crystalline zones are separated by a thin zone of metamorphosed and strongly deformed sedimentary cover rocks of the Tethys sea. In the south, the Simano and Adula nappes lie on top of the Gotthard nappe.

The Gotthard nappe crops out in an elongated strip through the Central Alps. This outcrop begins west of the mountain ridge between the Binntal and the Goms (the valley of the Rhone) east of Brig. It stays south of the Goms and south of the Furka Pass, Andermatt, north of Airolo in the Valle Leventina, south of the Oberalp Pass, Disentis and ends south of the eastern part of the Surselva (the valley of the Vorderrhein).

== Geology ==
The outcrop can be divided into three parts or zones: a central core of Ordovician orthogneiss, called the Streifengneis ("striped gneiss"); flanked on both sides by zones of mica schist or paragneiss. The northern paragneiss zone contains lenses of various lithologies, such as calcareous schists, amphibolite, eclogite, peridotite (mostly thoroughly serpentinized) and gabbro. The southern paragneiss zone contains characteristic hornblende-garnet schists called Garbenschiefer, part of the Tremola series.

The crystalline rocks of the Gotthard nappe carry strong traces of at least two older orogenies before the Alpine orogeny. The oldest phase, sometimes (erroneously) called "Caledonian", took place in the Ordovician. The paragneiss of the Gotthard nappe was once oceanic sediment, which was deformed into an accretionary wedge during this orogeny. The gabbros and peridotites, now lenses in the paragneiss, probably represent pieces of oceanic crust underneath these sediments, that were incorporated into the Ordovician accretionary wedge. The eclogite metamorphism has been dated at about 470 Ma (million years ago).

In the late stages of the Ordovician orogenic phase, granitoid magma bodies intruded, especially granite. During the Hercynian orogeny, about 320 Ma, all of these units were strongly deformed. Today, the Ordovician intrusives form the Streifengneis of the central zone. The Hercynian orogeny ended with another phase of granitoid intrusions. Four Hercynian intrusive bodies are found in the current outcrop of the Gotthard nappe: the Rotondo granite north of the Val Bedretto, the Fibbia and Gamsboden granites close to the Gotthard Pass and the Cristallina granite around the Lukmanier Pass. These intrusions have ages between 305 and 290 Ma.

== See also ==
- Aarmassif
- Geology of the Alps
