= Geology of Timor-Leste =

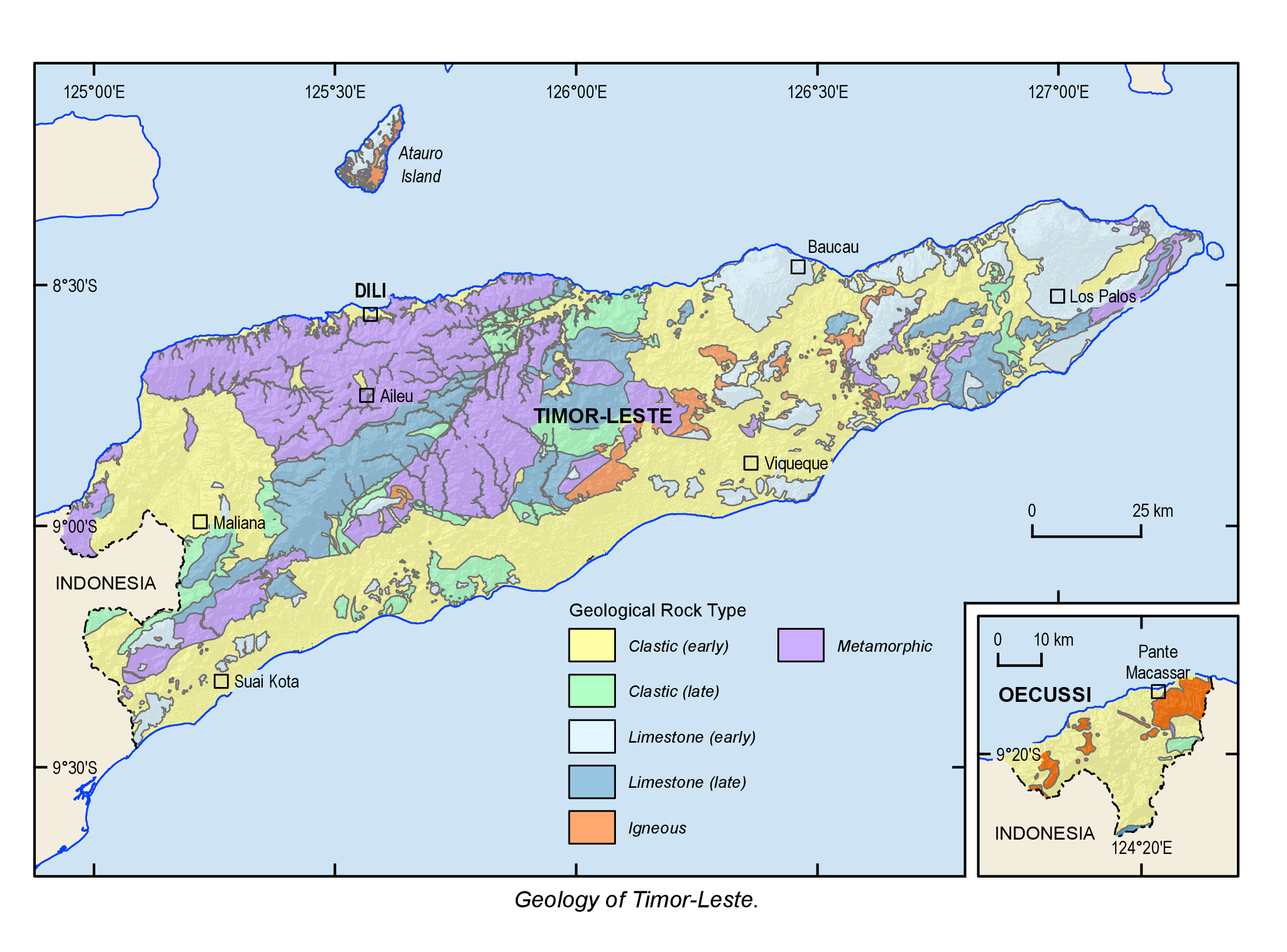
Geology of Timor-Leste

The geology of Timor-Leste has been studied onshore and with offshore seismic studies. The region experienced rifting between the Permian and early Cretaceous. Shallow water sediments shifted to deep water sediments by the Triassic. The region was a subsiding passive margin from the Early Cretaceous through the Eocene, experiencing deep water carbonate and shale deposition.

During the mid-Eocene, the Australian Plate collided with a subduction zone, generating folds and thrusts plus emplacing sheets of ophiolite and continental rock on top of Mesozoic sedimentary rocks. Some eroded sediments were shifted into a neighboring foredeep and these tectonic conditions produced oil-forming conditions in Triassic shales. Slow subsidence and carbonate deposition were typical of the region from the Eocene through the Miocene, until a second phase of thrusting uplifted onshore structures up to one kilometer. Offshore thrust sheets were buried beneath Pliocene and Pleistocene sediments.
