= Geology of France =

Geologic map of France.

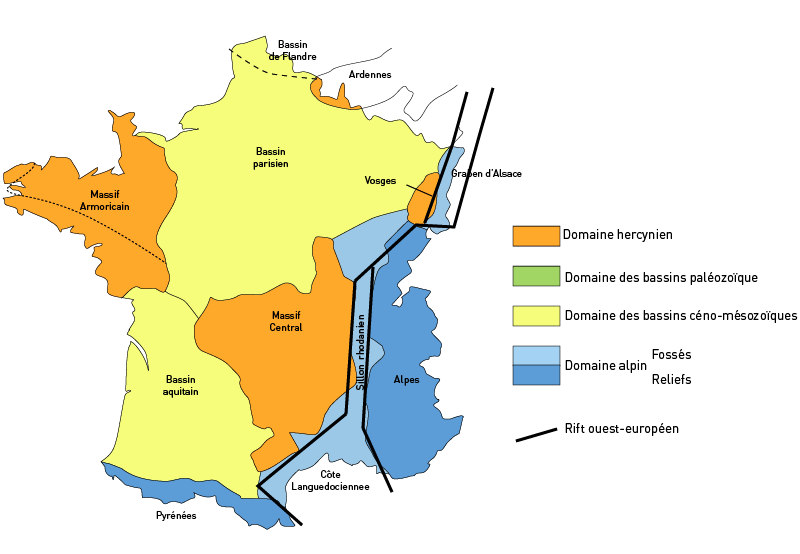
Divisions in French Regional Geology.

The regional geology of France is commonly divided into the Paris Basin, the Armorican Massif, the Massif Central, the Aquitaine Basin, the Pyrenees, the Alps, the Côte languedocienne, the Sillon rhodanien, the Massif des Vosges, the Massif Ardennais, the Alsace graben (Rhine graben) and Flanders Basin.

== Alpine orogen ==
The regions Alsace, Franche-Comté, Rhône-Alpes and Provence-Alpes-Côte d'Azur are part of the Western Alps. Sediment from the Valais ocean crop out in the Versoyen unit. The basement of the Briançonnais microcontinent crop out at Gran Paradiso, Dora Maira, Ambine, Vanoise and Ruitor. The Briançonnais cover sequences crop out in the Zone Houillère. External massifs include the Belledonne massif, Mont Blanc massif, Pelvoux-Écrins massif and the Argentera massif. Sediments from the Piemont-Liguria Ocean crop out in Embrunais and Ubaye. The Jura Mountains are part of the Helvetic nappes, that represent deposits from the European margin that were involved in the Alpine orogeny.

== Massif Central ==
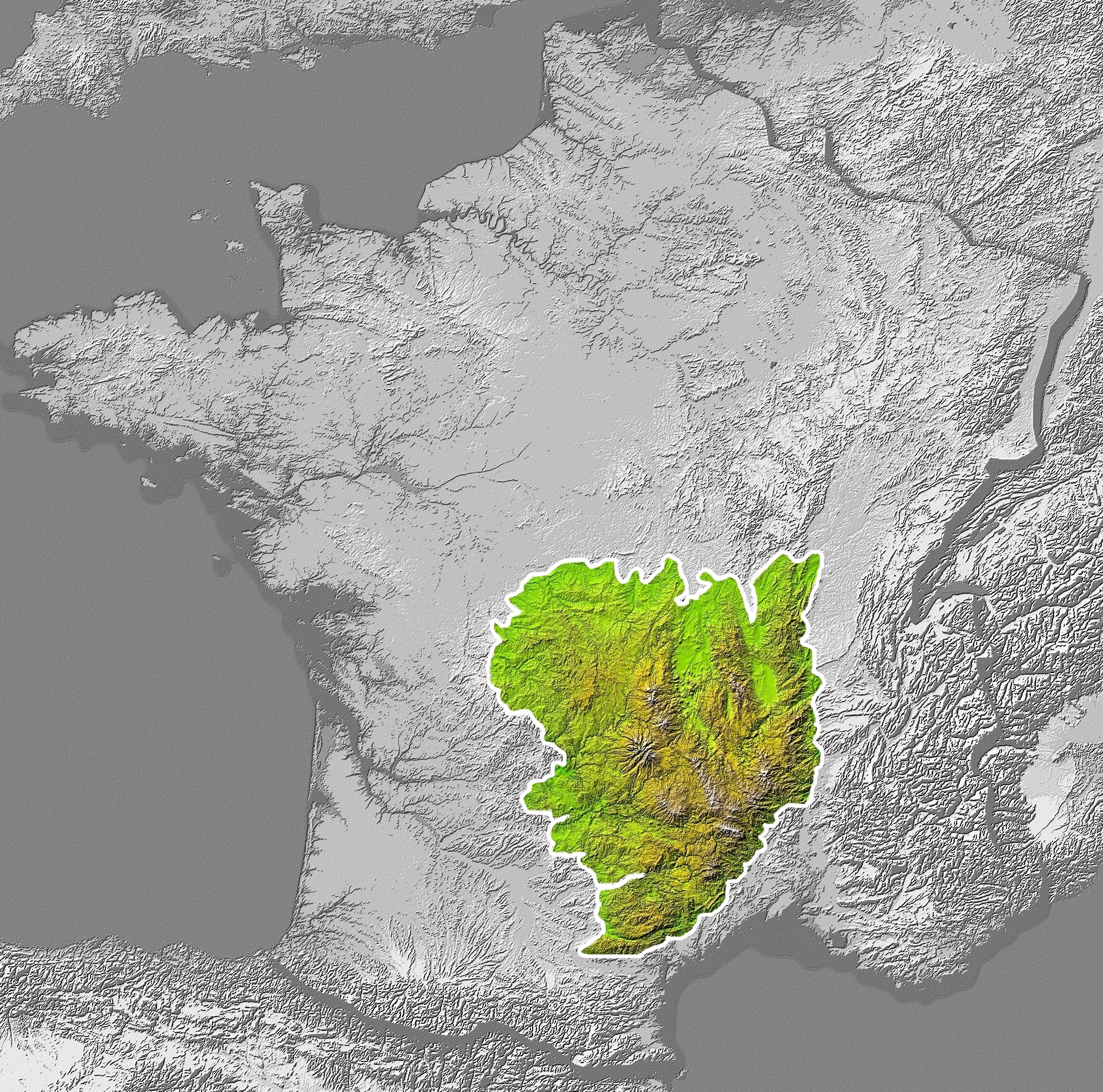
The Massif Central highlighted on an elevation map.

The geographic region of the Massif Central coincides with the geologic region with the same name. It is part of the Variscan orogenic cycle. It was also a region of active volcanism during the Cenozoic.
