= Helvetic nappes =

Geological structures thrust north by Alps orogeny

The Helvetic nappes (German: Helvetische Decken) are a series of nappes in the Northern part of the Alps and part of the Helvetic zone. They consist of Mesozoic limestones, shales and marls that were originally deposited on the southern continental margin of the European continent. During the Alpine orogeny they were thrust north over a décollement and at the same time were internally deformed by folding and thrusting.

== Tectonic location ==
The Helvetic nappes are thrust over the Infrahelvetic complex and the external massifs of the Alps (like the Aarmassif or Mont Blanc Massif). In Switzerland, Germany and Austria they are also thrust over the Molasse basin of the Alpine foreland. In turn, the Helvetic nappes were overthrust by the Penninic nappes from the south. In Switzerland these have been eroded away at most places but in Germany and Austria they are still covering the Helvetic nappes. Due to this the Helvetic nappes only crop out as a thin band in those countries, which forms the Northern Limestone Alps.

== Lithology ==
The Helvetic nappes consist of Mesozoic sedimentary rocks deposited on the former southern continental margin of the European plate. A narrow ocean, the Valais Ocean, existed south of Central Europe in the Mesozoic. This later developed into a convergent plate boundary where the European plate subducted beneath the Apulian plate. The sedimentary facies of the rocks from this age thus becomes deeper marine when the rocks were deposited further south. Therefore, the rocks of the Helvetic nappes have a shallower marine facies than the contemporary Bündner slates of the Penninic nappes; and a deeper facies than the rocks of the Infrahelvetic complex of Eastern Switzerland or contemporary sediments in the Jura Mountains north of the Alps.

== See also ==
- Geology of the Alps
