= Piggyback basin =

A piggyback basin (also piggy-back, thrust-sheet-top, detached, or satellite basin) is a minor sedimentary basin developed on top of a moving thrust sheet as part of a foreland basin system. Piggyback basins form in the wedge-top depositional zone of a foreland basin system as new thrusts in the foreland cut up through the existing footwall containing the eroded wedge-top basins in the old thrust sheet. The basin is separated from the foredeep by an anticline or syndepositional growth structures. The piggyback basin is named after its tendency to be carried passively toward the hinterland with the old thrust sheet in response to the compressive forces of the new thrust sheet. Sedimentary fill for the basin comes from the hanging wall ramp of the older thrust sheet, from the foreland orogeny or from the sides of the basin. Drainage into the basin may come from highs associated with the thrust sheets or the basin may be filled from longitudinal flows across the basin.

The Apennine (southern) margin of the Po basin in northern Italy and the Pyrenean (northern) margin of the Ebro basin in northern Spain have small sedimentary basins which were example basins used to initially describe the occurrence and tectonics of piggyback basins. The Tannheim-Losenstein basin in the Eastern Alps is a deep marine piggyback basin.

== See also ==
- Molasse basin – Foreland basin north of the Alps
