= List of earthquakes in 1901 =

Earthquakes in 1901
Approximate epicenters of the earthquakes in 1901
- 4.0–5.9 magnitude
- 6.0–6.9 magnitude
- 7.0–7.9 magnitude
- 8.0+ magnitude
- Strongest: France, Loyalty Islands, New Caledonia (Magnitude 7.9) August 9
- Deadliest: Qing Dynasty, Yunnan Province, China (Magnitude 6.5) February 15 101 deaths
- Total fatalities: 125

Number by magnitude
- 9.0+: 0
- 8.0–8.9: 0
- 7.0–7.9: 15
- 6.0–6.9: 15
- 5.0–5.9: 1

This is a list of earthquakes in 1901. Only magnitude 6.0 or greater earthquakes appear on the list. Exceptions to this are earthquakes which have caused death, injury or damage. Events which occurred in remote areas will be excluded from the list as they wouldn't have generated significant media interest. All dates are listed according to UTC time. The countries and their flags are noted as they would have appeared in this year for example the Netherlands being in control of present-day Indonesia. In all another year of below average activity. There were 15 magnitude 7.0+ events. Japan saw a great deal of activity this year. The majority of the 125 deaths came in China from an event in February.

== Overall ==
=== By death toll ===
Rank	Death toll	Magnitude	Location	MMI	Depth (km)	Date
1	101	6.5	Qing Dynasty, Yunnan Province, China	VIII (Severe)	0.0	February 15
2	18	7.5	Japan, off the east coast of Honshu	( )	35.0	August 9

- Note: At least 10 casualties

=== By magnitude ===
Rank	Magnitude	Death toll	Location	MMI	Depth (km)	Date
1	7.9	1	France, Loyalty Islands, New Caledonia	( )	0.0	August 9
2	7.5	18	Japan, off the east coast of Honshu	( )	35.0	August 9
3	7.3	0	Russian Empire, Kuril Islands	( )	35.0	April 5
= 4	7.5	0	Ecuador, offshore	( )	17.0	January 7
= 4	7.2	0	United Kingdom Solomon Islands	( )	0.0	May 25
= 4	7.2	0	Japan, Ryukyu Islands	( )	35.0	June 24
= 4	7.2	0	Japan, off the east coast of Honshu	( )	35.0	August 9
= 5	7.1	0	Canada, British Columbia	( )	0.0	January 18
= 5	7.1	0	Honduras, Nicaragua, border area	( )	0.0	October 8
= 5	7.1	0	Mexico, Gulf of California	( )	0.0	December 9
= 5	7.1	0	United States, Andreanof Islands, Alaska	( )	0.0	December 31
= 6	7.0	0	Japan, off the east coast of Honshu	( )	35.0	June 15
= 6	7.0	0	Netherlands, Molucca Sea, Dutch East Indies	( )	0.0	November 25
= 6	7.0	0	United States Philippines, Luzon	VII (Very strong)	0.0	December 14
= 6	7.0	0	United States, south of Alaska	( )	0.0	December 30

- Note: At least 7.0 magnitude

== Notable events ==
=== January ===
January
- Strongest: 7.5 M_{w} Ecuador
- Total fatalities: 0

Number by magnitude
- 8.0–8.9: 0
- 7.0–7.9: 2
- 6.0–6.9: 1

Date	Country and location	M_{w}	Depth (km)	MMI	Notes	Casualties	
Date	Country and location	M_{w}	Depth (km)	MMI	Notes	Dead	Injured
7	Ecuador, offshore	7.5	17.0		Depth.		
13	Japan, off the south coast of Hokkaido	6.8	35.0				
18	Canada, British Columbia	7.1	0.0		Depth unknown.		

=== February ===
February
- Strongest: 6.5 M_{w} Qing Dynasty China
- Deadliest: 6.5 M_{w} Qing Dynasty China; 101 deaths
- Total fatalities: 101

Number by magnitude
- 8.0–8.9: 0
- 7.0–7.9: 0
- 6.0–6.9: 1

Date	Country and location	M_{w}	Depth (km)	MMI	Notes	Casualties	
Date	Country and location	M_{w}	Depth (km)	MMI	Notes	Dead	Injured
15	Qing Dynasty, Yunnan Province, China	6.5	0.0	VIII	Depth unknown. At least 101 people were killed and major damage was caused. Many homes were destroyed.	101	

=== March ===
March
- Strongest: 6.9 M_{w} 2 events
- Deadliest: 6.4 M_{w} Bulgaria; 4 deaths
- Total fatalities: 4

Number by magnitude
- 8.0–8.9: 0
- 7.0–7.9: 0
- 6.0–6.9: 4

Date	Country and location	M_{w}	Depth (km)	MMI	Notes	Casualties	
Date	Country and location	M_{w}	Depth (km)	MMI	Notes	Dead	Injured
3	United States, central California	6.4	0.0	VIII	Depth unknown. The Parkfield earthquake caused some damage.		
5	Mexico, Gulf of California	6.9	0.0		Depth unknown.		
16	German Empire, offshore Lindi Region, German East Africa	6.9	0.0		Depth unknown.		
31	Bulgaria, Dobrich Province	7.2	0.0	VIII	Depth unknown. 4 people died and 50 were injured in the 1901 Black Sea earthquake. 1,200 homes were damaged or destroyed.	4	50

=== April ===
April
- Strongest: 7.3 M_{w} Russian Empire
- Total fatalities: 0

Number by magnitude
- 8.0–8.9: 0
- 7.0–7.9: 1
- 6.0–6.9: 2

Date	Country and location	M_{w}	Depth (km)	MMI	Notes	Casualties	
Date	Country and location	M_{w}	Depth (km)	MMI	Notes	Dead	Injured
5	Netherlands, Halmahera, Dutch East Indies	6.8	0.0		Depth unknown.		
5	Russian Empire, Kuril Islands	7.3	35.0				
21	Qing Dynasty, eastern Xizang Province, China	6.8	0.0		Depth unknown.		

=== May ===
May
- Strongest: 7.2 M_{w} United Kingdom, Solomon Islands
- Total fatalities: 0

Number by magnitude
- 8.0–8.9: 0
- 7.0–7.9: 1
- 6.0–6.9: 1

Date	Country and location	M_{w}	Depth (km)	MMI	Notes	Casualties	
Date	Country and location	M_{w}	Depth (km)	MMI	Notes	Dead	Injured
14	Russian Empire, Kuril Islands	6.6	35.0				
25	United Kingdom, Solomon Islands	7.2	0.0		Depth unknown.		

=== June ===
June
- Strongest: 7.2 M_{w} Japan
- Total fatalities: 0

Number by magnitude
- 8.0–8.9: 0
- 7.0–7.9: 2
- 6.0–6.9: 1

Date	Country and location	M_{w}	Depth (km)	MMI	Notes	Casualties	
Date	Country and location	M_{w}	Depth (km)	MMI	Notes	Dead	Injured
15	Japan, off the east coast of Honshu	7.0	35.0				
24	Japan, Ryukyu Islands	7.2	35.0		A tsunami caused some damage.		
24	Japan, Ryukyu Islands	6.5	35.0		Aftershock.		

=== August ===
August
- Strongest: 7.9 M_{w} France
- Deadliest: 7.5 M_{w} Japan; 18 deaths
- Total fatalities: 19

Number by magnitude
- 8.0–8.9: 0
- 7.0–7.9: 3
- 6.0–6.9: 2

Date	Country and location	M_{w}	Depth (km)	MMI	Notes	Casualties	
Date	Country and location	M_{w}	Depth (km)	MMI	Notes	Dead	Injured
9	Japan, off the east coast of Honshu	7.2	35.0		Foreshock. Some damage was caused in the area.		
9	France, Loyalty Islands, New Caledonia	7.9	0.0		Depth unknown. A tsunami resulted in at least 1 fatality. Some damage was caused in the area.	1	
9	Japan, off the east coast of Honshu	7.5	0.0		Depth unknown. 18 people were killed. 8 homes collapsed and another 615 needed repair. Roads and railways suffered extensive damage.	18	
10	German New Guinea, north of Bougainville Island, Papua New Guinea	6.9	0.0				
11	United Kingdom, Fiji	6.8	0.0				

=== September ===
September
- Strongest: 6.9 M_{w} United Kingdom, Solomon Islands
- Total fatalities: 0

Number by magnitude
- 8.0–8.9: 0
- 7.0–7.9: 0
- 6.0–6.9: 2

Date	Country and location	M_{w}	Depth (km)	MMI	Notes	Casualties	
Date	Country and location	M_{w}	Depth (km)	MMI	Notes	Dead	Injured
8	United Kingdom, Santa Cruz Islands, Solomon Islands	6.9	0.0		Depth unknown.		
10	(United States) , Luzon, Philippines	0.0	0.0	VII	Unknown magnitude or depth. Some damage was caused in the area.		
30	Japan, off the east coast of Honshu	6.8	0.0		Depth unknown. Aftershock.		

=== October ===
October
- Strongest: 7.1 M_{w} Honduras, Nicaragua
- Total fatalities: 0

Number by magnitude
- 8.0–8.9: 0
- 7.0–7.9: 0
- 6.0–6.9: 0

Date	Country and location	M_{w}	Depth (km)	MMI	Notes	Casualties	
Date	Country and location	M_{w}	Depth (km)	MMI	Notes	Dead	Injured
8	Honduras, Nicaragua border area	7.1	0.0		Depth unknown. Some damage was caused in the area. A tsunami was generated.		

=== November ===
November
- Strongest: 7.0 M_{w} Netherlands
- Deadliest: 6.8 M_{w} New Zealand; 1 death
- Total fatalities: 1

Number by magnitude
- 8.0–8.9: 0
- 7.0–7.9: 1
- 6.0–6.9: 1

Date	Country and location	M_{w}	Depth (km)	MMI	Notes	Casualties	
Date	Country and location	M_{w}	Depth (km)	MMI	Notes	Dead	Injured
15	New Zealand, South Island	6.8	33.0		The 1901 Cheviot earthquake resulted in 1 death and major damage.	1	
25	Netherlands, Molucca Sea, Dutch East Indies	7.0	0.0		Depth unknown.		

=== December ===
December
- Strongest: 7.1 M_{w} 2 events
- Total fatalities: 0

Number by magnitude
- 8.0–8.9: 0
- 7.0–7.9: 4
- 6.0–6.9: 0
- 5.0–5.9: 1

Date	Country and location	M_{w}	Depth (km)	MMI	Notes	Casualties	
Date	Country and location	M_{w}	Depth (km)	MMI	Notes	Dead	Injured
9	Mexico, Gulf of California	7.1	0.0				
14	United States, Luzon, Philippines	7.0	33.0	VII	Some damage was reported in the region.		
18	Ottoman Empire, Balikesir Province, Turkey	5.9	0.0	VIII	Depth unknown. Some damage was reported in the region. Hundreds of homes were damaged.		
30	United States, south of Alaska	7.0	0.0	VI	Depth unknown.		
31	United States, Fox Islands (Alaska)	7.1	0.0		Depth unknown. Some damage was caused. A tsunami was reported.		
