= Molasse basin =

Foreland basin north of the Alps

Coordinates: 47°46′08″N 10°08′25″E

The Molasse basin (or North Alpine foreland basin) is a foreland basin north of the Alps which formed during the Oligocene and Miocene epochs. The basin formed as a result of the flexure of the European plate under the weight of the orogenic wedge of the Alps that was forming to the south.

In geology, the name "molasse basin" is sometimes also used in a general sense for a synorogenic (formed contemporaneously with the orogen) foreland basin of the type north of the Alps. The basin is the type locality of molasse, a sedimentary sequence of conglomerates and sandstones, material that was removed from the developing mountain chain by erosion and denudation, that is typical for foreland basins.

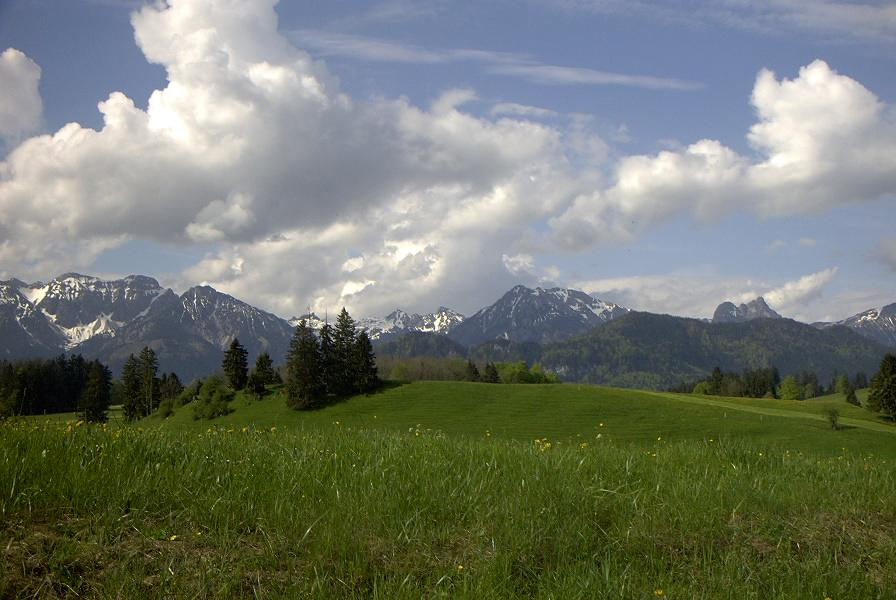
The Bavarian Alps rise from the green hills of the Molasse basin. The hills consist of tilted molasse beds, erosional material transported from the mountains into their foreland.

== Geographic location ==
The Molasse basin stretches over 1000 kilometers along the long axis of the Alps, in France, Switzerland, Germany and Austria. The west end is at Lake Geneva, where the basin's outcrop is just 20 km wide. Further to the northeast the basin becomes wider. It forms the subsurface of the Swiss Plateau (Mittelland) and reaches its widest (circa 130 km) in the Bavarian foreland of the Alps. From Amstetten to Sankt Pölten the basin forms a narrow band, just 10 km wide. After that it widens again to the east. North of the Danube River it connects with the Vienna Basin, and is thus connected with the Pannonian Basin further east.

The region where the molasse crops out is divided into two: the Subalpine Molasse zone along the Alps and the Foreland Molasse zone further into the foreland. In the Foreland Molasse zone the molasse sediments are relatively undisturbed; in the Subalpine Molasse zone the beds are often tilted, folded and thrust over each other.

== Tectonic history ==
Before the development of the Molasse basin, in the Mesozoic era, the region was covered by a shallow sea that was the northern margin of the Alpine part of the Tethys Ocean (Valais Ocean in the west, Tethys Ocean proper in the east). The Molasse basin was formed when the orogenic wedge of the forming Alps was pushed north over the European continental margin, due to the convergent movement of the European and Apulian plates during the Paleogene period. The weight of the orogenic wedge made the European plate bend downward, forming a deep marine foredeep. In the Eocene epoch (55 to 34 million years ago) the basin became deeper until north of the developing orogen it formed a small oceanic trench, in which flysch sediments were deposited.

The huge amounts of sediments eroded from the forming mountain chain filled the basin and made it shallower. During the Oligocene and Miocene epochs (more exactly, between 10 and 30 million years ago), shallow marine to continental molasse was deposited in the basin. Around 10 to 5 million years ago, tectonic uplift had raised the basin so high that net sedimentation stopped. From the south, the molasse deposits were overthrust about 10 kilometers by the Helvetic nappes, which caused the deformation in the Subalpine Molasse zone. The Jura Mountains, a fold and thrust belt along the present Swiss-French border, also originated from this tectonic phase. In some places in the Jura Mountains, molasse deposits were folded together with older Mesozoic limestones. In present-day central Switzerland, however, the molasse formed a thick competent mass that was thrust northward in one piece over a decollement horizon at the base of the Mesozoic, in Triassic evaporites. Deformation instead localized further north, thus forming the relatively flat Swiss Mittelland between the Alps and the Jura Mountains. The Swiss part of the Molasse basin is now between the Alps and the Jura Mountains, as a large piggyback basin. In the Eastern Alps an external mountain range such as the Jura Mountains never developed. Due to the last phase of tectonic uplift around 5 million years ago, the molasse in the Swiss Plateau, the South Bavarian plain and Eastern Austria is now 350 to 400 meters above sea level at its northern rim, slowly rises southwards and can reach more than 1,000 m at its contact with the Alps.

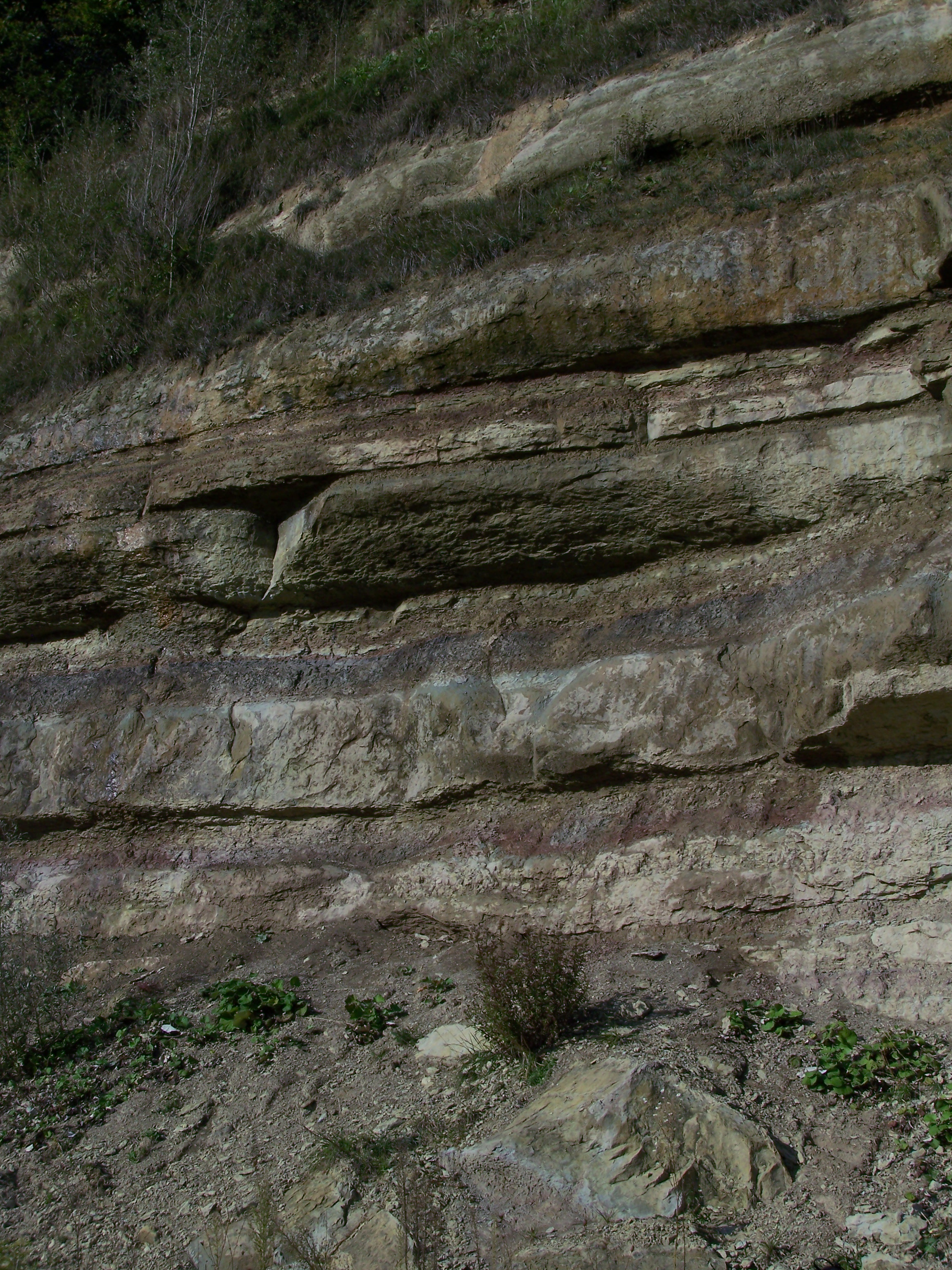
Alternating grey fluviatile sands and red silty marls of the Lower Freshwater Molasse at Wallenried, Switzerland.

== Stratigraphy ==
The molasse deposits in the basin can be up to 6 kilometers thick. Lithostratigraphically, this molasse is treated as a group divided into four formations. This division is made on whether the sedimentary facies is continental or marine.

The lowermost formation is the Lower Marine Molasse (in German: Untere Meeresmolasse). Its age is Rupelian (early Oligocene, 34 to 28 million years old) and it consists of shallow marine sand, clay and marl.

On top of this is the Lower Freshwater Molasse (German: Untere Süsswassermolasse) of Chattian and Aquitanian age (late Oligocene-early Miocene, 28 to 22 million years old). Due to a eustatic drop of the sea level combined by tectonic uplift, the basin was now above sea level. This second formation therefore consists of fluviatile sands and clays and huge alluvial fan systems (conglomerates and breccias) originating from the Alps to the south.

By 22 million years ago, the Alpine foreland was flooded again due to tectonic subsidence. A shallow (intertidal) marine environment formed from Lyon to Vienna. In this environment the third formation, the Upper Marine Molasse (German: Obere Meeresmolasse), was formed. It consists of marine sands, clays and marls and new fan conglomerates and is of Burdigalian to Langhian age (early Miocene, 22 to 16 million years old).

More tectonic uplift caused the sea to retreat one final time and during the Serravallian, Tortonian and Messinian/Pontian ages (late Miocene, 16 to 5 million years ago), the basin was in a continental facies again. The fluviatile sands and clays and fan conglomerates of this time form the Upper Freshwater Molasse (German: Obere Süsswassermolasse), the topmost molasse formation.

Around 5 million years ago a phase of uplift occurred in the Alps. During this phase the Molasse basin ceased to be an area of net sedimentation.
