= Thick-skinned deformation =

Thick-skinned deformation is a geological term which refers to crustal shortening that involves basement rocks and deep-seated faults as opposed to only the upper units of cover rocks above the basement which is known as thin-skinned deformation. While thin-skinned deformation is common in many different localities, thick-skinned deformation requires much more strain to occur and is a rarer type of deformation.

== Definition ==
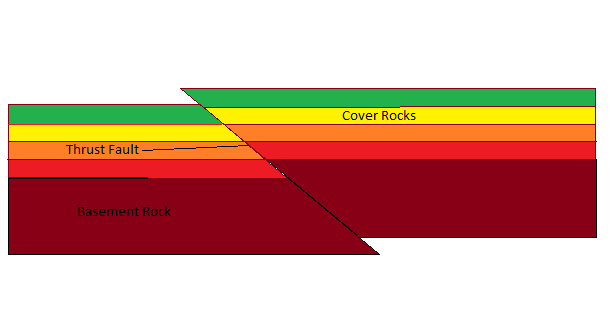
Diagram of the thick-skinned deformation of a thrust-fault.

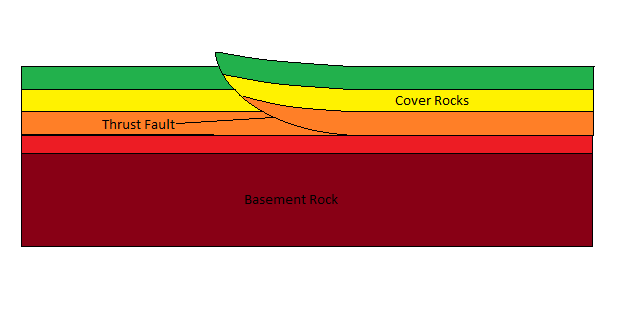
Diagram of the thin-skinned deformation of a thrust-fault.

Different processes can deform rocks, the deformation is almost always the result of stress. This stress leads to the formation of fault and fold structures, both can either extend or shorten of the Earth's crust. Thick-skinned deformation specifically affects deep crystalline rock of the basement and may extend deeper into the lower crust. Thin-skinned deformation affects the upper crustal layers and does not deform the deeper basement.

== Causes ==
Thick-skinned deformation is most commonly a result of crustal shortening and occurs when the region is undergoing horizontal compression. This frequently occurs in at the sites of continental collisions where orogenesis, or mountain building, is taking place and during which the crust is shortened horizontally and thickened vertically. The massive compressional forces involved in such a collision cause the basement rock and all of the units above it to deform. Deformation occurs in the form of both folds and thrust faults and may form a fold and thrust belt along the collisional zone or as crustal flow.

Continent-continent collision

At convergent plate boundaries two plates move towards each other as one is subducted downwards beneath the other but when the crust of two continents meet at a convergent zone neither one of them will be subducted due to their low density. As the two continents are pushed together by tectonic processes a large amount of stress is put on the rock. Eventually deformation will occur in one or multiple ways in order to relieve the stress.

=== Folds ===
Folding usually occurs in areas with a very slow strain rate or when the rock being deformed is relatively weak and ductile. As folding occurs the units of rock bend forming anticlines, ridges, and synclines, valleys. While the true thickness of the underlying crust may not be equal to the elevation changes of the resulting mountains and hills, the average crustal thickness is greater than before the deformation occurred. One way in which folding can occur in such a formation is by a small amount of subduction of one plate. One continent may be partially overridden by the other but since the plate is far too light to sink it will uplift the overriding plate creating very large folds that deform the entire crust.

=== Faults ===
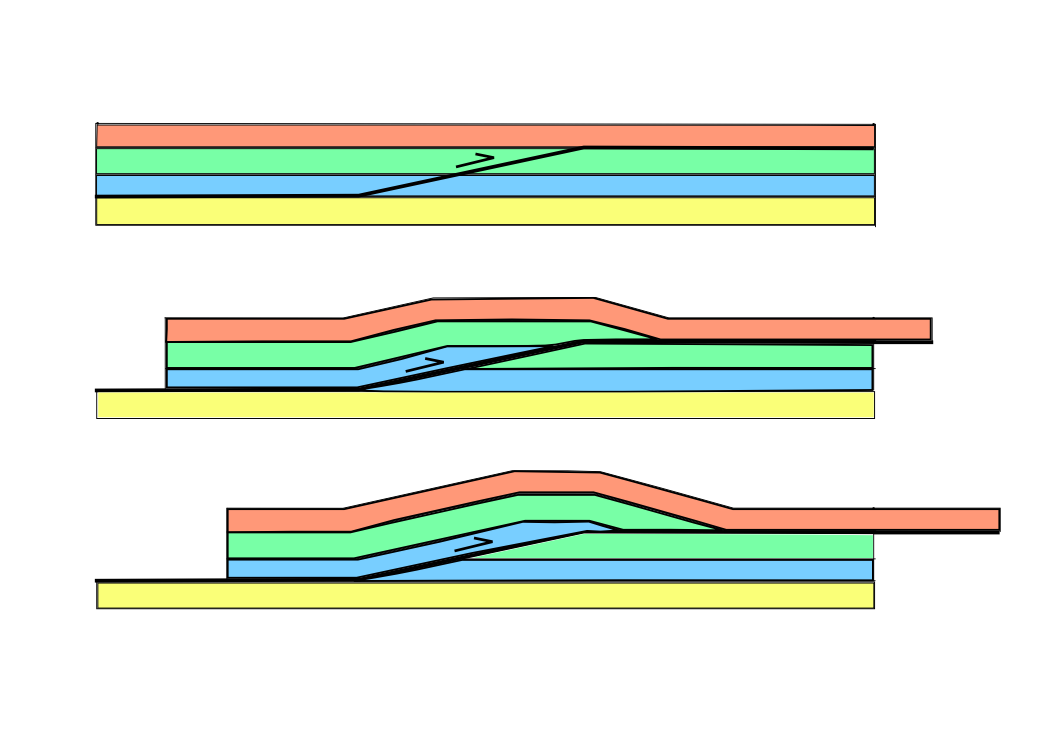
Diagram of the evolution of a thrust-fault.

Thrust faults are another common form of deformation to occur in these areas. Faulting is generally the result of greater strain rates and stronger or more brittle rocks. These faults have a high angle and cause thickening by uplifting the rock onto itself. These types of faults are identified by the vertically repeating stratigraphy that they produce. During a collision when the strain reaches the breaking point of the rock a fracture will form in the rock. This fracture cuts across layers of rock to form a ramp which will allow movement to dissipate the accumulated strain. Under compression the upper hanging wall rises and overrides the lower foot wall.

=== Crustal flow ===
The final type of deformation is crustal flow. This type of deformation is only able to occur when the crustal material is heated to a very high temperature, approximately 2/3 of its melting temperature. When this occurs in a collisional zone then the rock can be deformed by creep and will behave similarly to a fluid over the long periods of geologic time.

== Examples ==
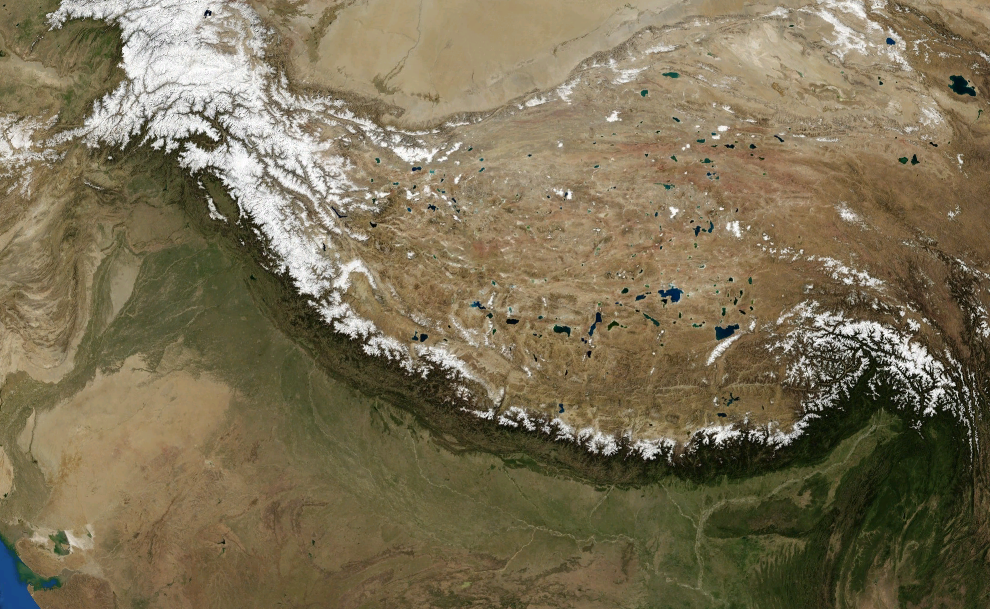
NASA Landsat-7 imagery of Himalayas

- Himalayan Mountains - The Himalayas of Tibet are at the location of a continental collision between the Indian and Asian continents and contains many examples of thick-skinned deformation.
- Andes Mountains - The Andes of South America are at the location of an subduction zone and are formed by thick-skinned deformation.
