= Thin-skinned deformation =

Style of deformation in plate tectonics

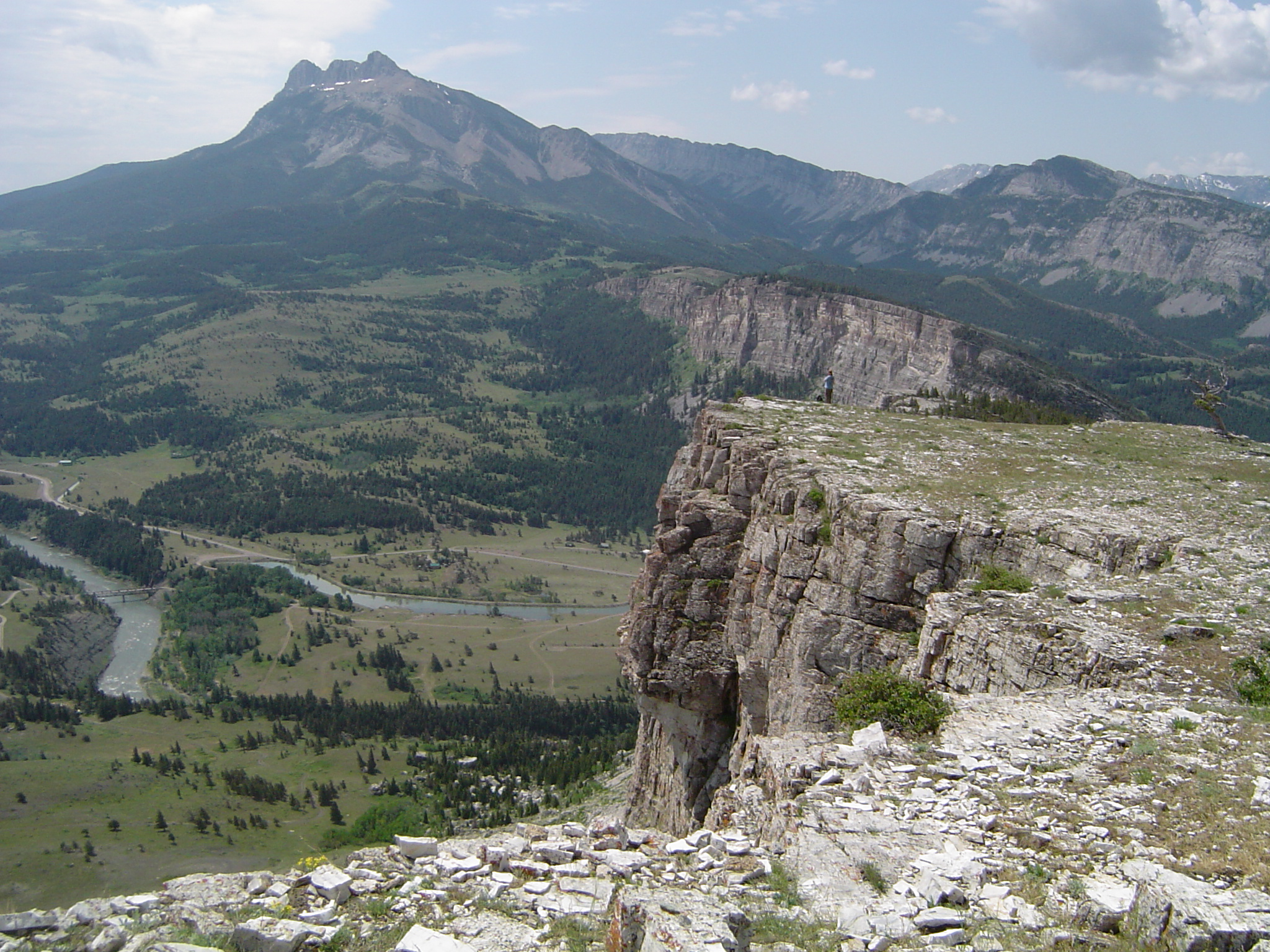
An example of thin-skinned thrusting in Montana. The white Madison Formation limestone is repeated, with one example in the foreground (that pinches out with distance) and another to the upper right corner and top of the picture.

Thin-skinned deformation is a style of deformation in plate tectonics at a convergent boundary which occurs with shallow thrust faults that only involves cover rocks (typically sedimentary rocks), and not deeper basement rocks.

The thin-skinned style of deformation is typical of many fold and thrust belts developed in the foreland of a collisional zone or back arc of a continental volcanic arc. This is particularly the case where a good basal decollement exists, usually in a weaker layer like a shale, evaporite, or a zone of high pore fluid pressure. This was first described in Rocky Mountains of the United States, as part of the Sevier Orogeny.

In the rock record, this will increase the influence of more surficial rocks, which usually includes sedimentary rocks. Typically, repeated sections of the same rock are seen over and over as thrust faults, coming up from the decollement, stack the same layer on top of itself. The sediments that are created by this type of deformation are typically lithic sandstones.

== See also ==
- Thick-skinned deformation
- Fold and thrust belts
