= Molasse =

Sedimentary rock deposit associated with the formation of mountain chains

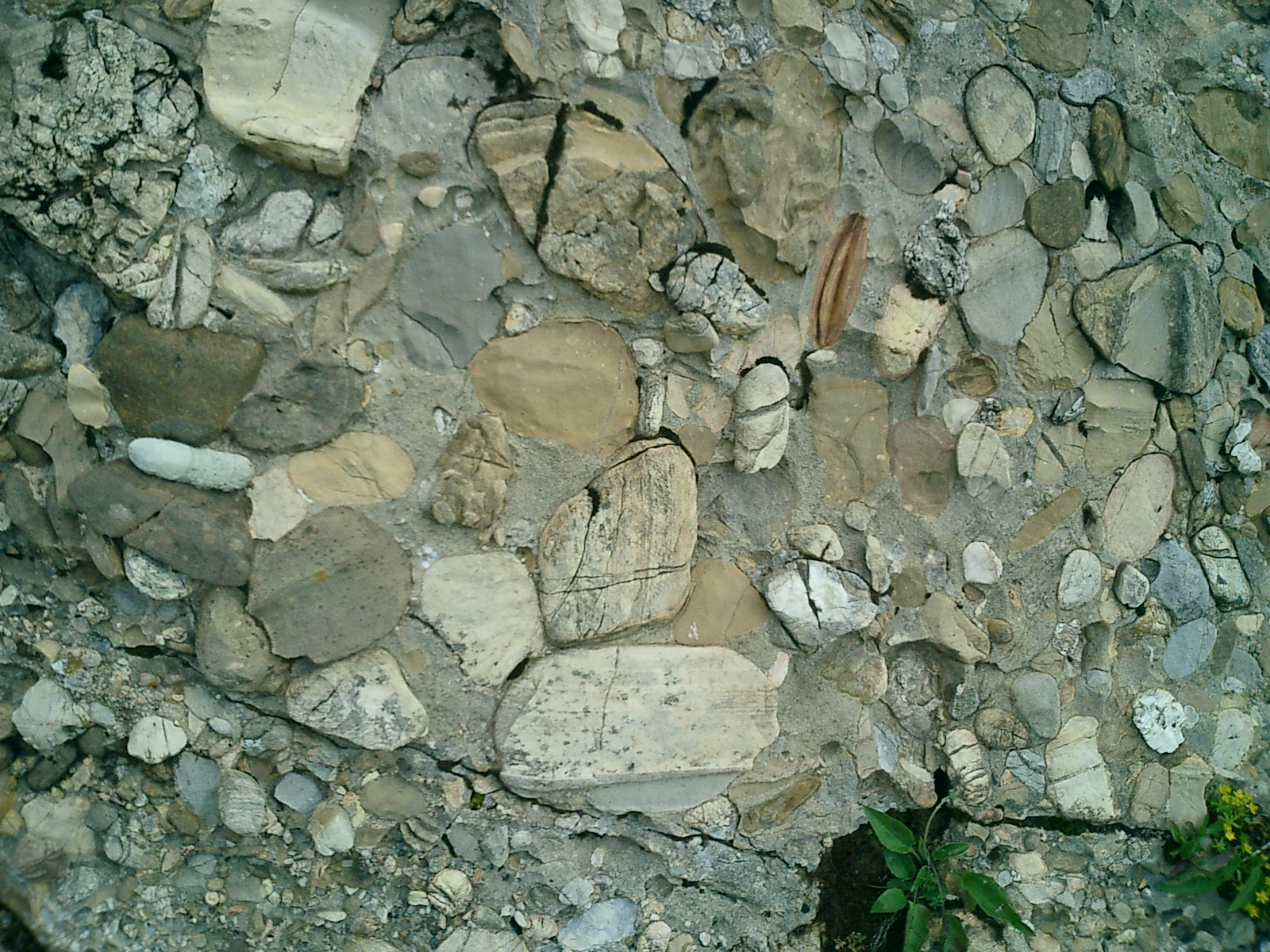
Nagelfluh-molasse, Speer, Appenzell Alps

In geology, "molasse" (/məˈlæs/) are sandstones, shales and conglomerates that form as terrestrial or shallow marine deposits in front of rising mountain chains. The molasse deposits accumulate in a foreland basin, especially on top of flysch-like deposits, for example, those that are left from the rising Alps, or erosion in the Himalaya. These deposits are typically the non-marine alluvial and fluvial sediments of lowlands, as compared to deep-water flysch sediments. Sedimentation stops when the orogeny stops, or when the mountains have eroded flat.

The molasse can sometimes completely fill a foreland basin, creating a nearly flat depositional surface, that nonetheless remains a structural syncline. Molasse can be very thick near the mountain front, but usually thins out towards the interior of a craton; such massive, convex accumulations of sediment are known as clastic wedges.

== See also ==
- Geology of the Himalaya – Origins and structure of the Himalayan Mountain range
- Molasse basin – Foreland basin north of the Alps
