= Aarmassif =

Geologic massif in the Swiss Alps

The Aarmassif or Aaremassif (German: Aarmassiv) is the easternmost geologic massif in the Swiss Alps. It contains a number of large mountain chains and parts of mountain chains.

== Name ==
The massif is named after the Aar, a river that has its source in the Aarmassif.

== Geography ==
The Aarmassif crops out in the eastern part of the Bernese Alps and the Lepontine Alps, roughly from Leukerbad in the west to the Tödi in the east. Further east the massif only appears in small windows like the Vättner window between Gigerwald and Vättis in Sankt Gallen and at the Limmerensee in the same canton. The Grimsel Pass crosses it.

== Tectonics and lithology ==
The Aarmassif is part of the Helvetic zone of the Alps, which consists of material originally from the European tectonic plate. The Aarmassif has lithologies common for Paleozoic basement rocks all over Europe, deformed and metamorphosed during the Variscan orogeny. Younger Mesozoic sedimentary rocks were eroded from this basement as a thrust fault brought the basement to the surface in the Alpine orogeny. Other places, where the European basement crops out in the Helvetic zone, are the mountain chains of the Massif des Écrins and of Mont Blanc in the French and Italian Alps.

The lithologies of the basement rocks are mainly gneisses, schists and amphibolites. These were in some places intruded by Permian granites after the Variscan orogeny, called Aare granite. During a late phase in the Alpine orogeny in the Tertiary the Aarmassif was uplifted in the form of a large elongated dome structure. The overlying limestones of the Helvetic nappes now have a very high dip angle, forming a ridge that appears at the Eiger and south of the Jungfrau mountain.

== See also ==
- Infrahelvetic complex
