= Moesian plate =

The Moesian plate, also known as the Moesian platform, is a microcontinent and crustal block in the southwestern part of the East European Craton. It extends 600 kilometers east to west and up to 300 kilometers north to south and lies beneath Romania and Bulgaria.

== Formation and structure ==
The Moesian Platform is made up of four terranes that accreted together during the Ordovician and Devonian as the small continent Avalonia collided with Baltica and Laurentia to form Laurussia. These terrains are sometimes referred to as Caledonian terrains, drawing parallels with the Caledonian orogeny.

The North Dobrogea terrane is a fifth, closely related terrane that lies closest to the East European craton, although it accreted last in the Carboniferous. Its current position is inferred to be the result of strike-slip faulting in the Mesozoic with the opening of Mediterranean-style oceanic basins.

Romanian Geological Survey borehole data was used to map the Moesian Platform, with results published in 2007 indicating a large southern section, the West Moesian Platform underlying much of the Romanian section of the Danube River and the coastal city of Varna. This structural unit is separated from the Balkan Terrane to the south by Paleogene, Pliocene and Quaternary uplift in the Balkan Thrust Front and to the north from other structural units by the Neogene Carpathian Front.

The East Moesian Platform extends up the coast, separated from the West Moesian Platform by the Intra-Moesian Fault. It in-turn is subdivided into the South Dobrogea and Central Dobrogea terranes, split by the Capidava-Ovidiu Fault. The Pecenage-Camena Fault separates these terranes from the North Dobrogea terrane which abuts the Pre-Dobrogean Depression along the Sfantu-Gheorghe Fault in the north.
