= Variscan orogeny =

Collision of tectonic plates resulting in the creation of mountains

Location of the Hercynian-Alleghenian mountain belts in the middle of the Carboniferous period. Present day coastlines are indicated in grey for reference.

The Variscan orogeny or Hercynian orogeny was a geologic mountain-building event caused by Late Paleozoic continental collision between Euramerica (Laurussia) and Gondwana to form the supercontinent of Pangaea. It remains visible today as a series of isolated massifs, including the Ardennes, Bohemian Massif, Vosges-Black Forest, Odenwald, Armorican Massif, Cornubian Massif, Massif Central, Iberian System and Gennargentu Massif. These are interspersed with Mesozoic and Cenozoic sedimentary basins. The chain also crops out in southern Ireland and was later incorporated into the Alpine orogeny (external crystalline massifs) and Pyrenean orogeny. These ancient massifs form the pre-Permian basement of western and Central Europe, part of a larger mountain system stretching from the Ural Mountains in Russia to the Appalachian Mountains in North America.

The chain originated from the convergence and collision of three continental masses: the microcontinent Armorica and the supercontinents Protogondwana and Laurussia (a union of Laurentia and Baltica from the Caledonian orogeny). This convergence contributed to the formation of the supercontinent Pangaea.

Today, the chain is heavily eroded, with most geological evidence consisting of metamorphic rocks and granites, which once formed the deep roots of the massif.

== Nomenclature ==
The name Variscan comes from the Medieval Latin name for the district Variscia, the home of a Germanic tribe, the Varisci; Eduard Suess, professor of geology at the University of Vienna, coined the term in 1880. (Variscite, a rare green mineral first discovered in the Vogtland district of Saxony in Germany, which is in the Variscan belt, has the same etymology.)

Hercynian, on the other hand, derives from the Hercynian Forest. Both words were descriptive terms of strike directions observed by geologists in the field, variscan for southwest to northeast, hercynian for northwest to southeast. The variscan direction reflected the direction of ancient fold belts cropping out throughout Germany and adjacent countries and the meaning shifted from direction to the fold belt proper.

One of the pioneers in research on the Variscan fold belt was the German geologist Franz Kossmat, establishing a still valid division of the European Variscides in 1927.

The other direction, Hercynian, for the direction of the Harz Mountains in Germany, saw a similar shift in meaning. Today, Hercynian is often used as a synonym for Variscan but is somewhat less used than the latter in the English speaking world. In the United States, it is used only for European orogenies; the contemporaneous and genetically linked mountain-building phases in the Appalachian Mountains have different names. "Variscan" is preferred for the orogenic cycle, and "Hercynian" for the resulting massifs, though both describe related geological entities.

The regional term Variscan underwent a further meaning shift since the 1960s. Geologists generally began to use it to characterize late Paleozoic fold-belts and orogenic phases having an age of approximately 380 to 280 Ma.

Some publications use the term Variscan for fold belts of even younger age, deviating from the meaning as a term for the North American and European orogeny related to the Gondwana-Laurasia collision.

== Distribution ==
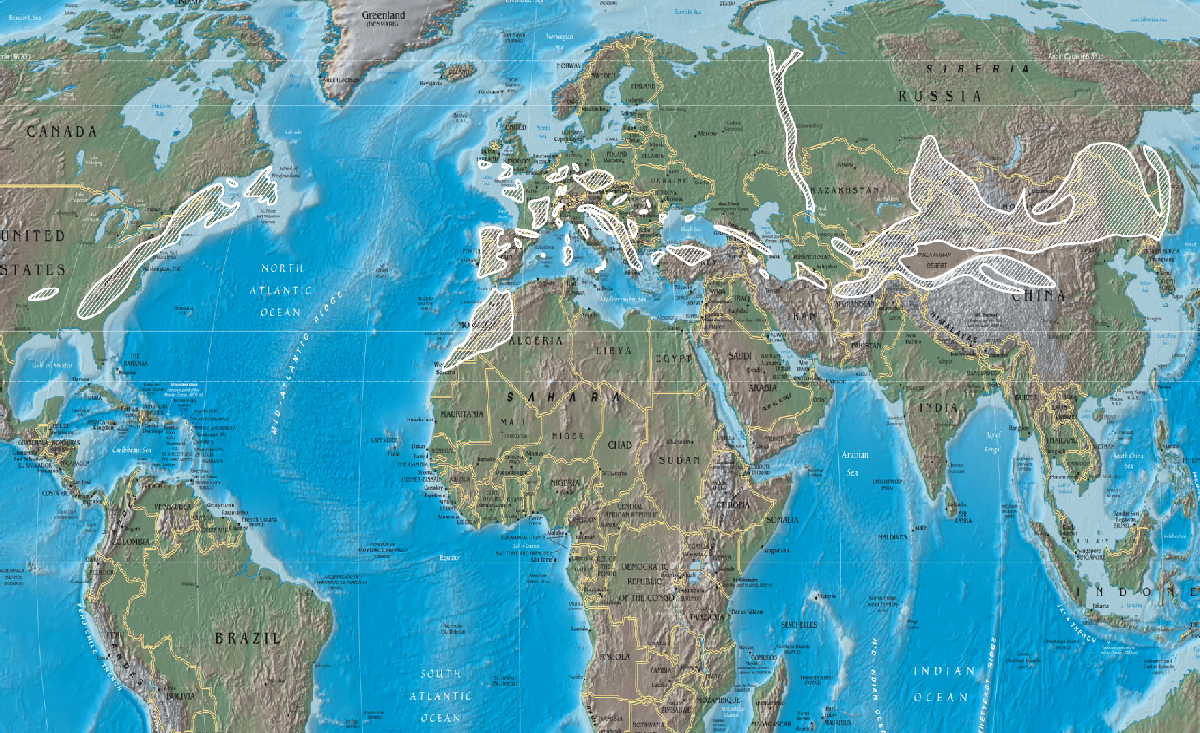
Hatched areas show the distribution of Variscan chains in Europe, North America (Appalachians), North Africa (Mauritanides), and other contemporaneous chains (Urals, Eurasian Steppe). The "Himalayan model" suggests the Variscan chain resembled parts of the modern Himalayas. Simplistically, 350 million years ago, there might have been an "Everest" in Lyon, an "Annapurna" in Clermont-Ferrand, and a "Tibet" where the Paris Basin now lies.

The European Variscan Belt includes the mountains of Portugal, Spain (Galicia, and the Pyrenees), southwestern Ireland (i.e. Munster), Cornwall, Devon, Pembrokeshire, the Gower Peninsula and the Vale of Glamorgan. In France, the belt occurs from Brittany, below the Paris Basin to the Ardennes, in the Massif Central, the Pyrenees, the Vosges and in Corsica.

The Variscan Belt reappears in Sardinia in Italy and in Germany where the Rhine Massif (Ardennes, Eifel, Hunsrück, Taunus and other regions on both sides of Middle Rhine Valley), the Black Forest, the Odenwald and Harz Mountains remain as testimony. In southern Iberia it is marked by a classic strike-slip suture zone between very distinct suspect terranes, and clear evidence can be seen of ductile shearing between high-grade metamorphic rocks and lower grade sedimentary rocks in a wide belt north of the Algarve and extending into the northernmost part the autonomous region of Andalusia and southern Extremadura.

In the Czech Republic and southwestern Poland the Bohemian Massif is the eastern end of the unmodified Variscan belt of crustal deformation in Europe. Further Variscan developments to the southeast are partly hidden and overprinted by the Alpine orogeny. In the Alps a Variscan core is built by Mercantour, Pelvoux, Belledonne, Montblanc and Aar Massif. Dinaric, Greek and Turkish mountain chains are the southeastern termination of the Variscan proper.

The Variscan was contemporaneous with the Acadian and Alleghenian orogeny in the United States and Canada, responsible for forming the Ouachita and Appalachian Mountains. North American areas with Variscan foldbelts include New England, Nova Scotia and Newfoundland and Labrador. The Moroccan Meseta and the Anti-Atlas in northwestern Africa show close relations to the Appalachian Mountains and used to form the eastern part of the Appalachian orogeny before the opening of the Atlantic Ocean in Jurassic times. 'Variscan' mountains in a broad chronological sense include the Urals, the Pamir, the Tian Shan and other Asian foldbelts.

The Variscan chain, stretching 5,000 kilometres (3,100 mi) long, 700 kilometres (430 mi) wide, and initially reaching 6,000 metres (20,000 ft) in elevation, is evident across Europe and beyond. Key regions include:

- External crystalline massifs of the Alps
- Vosges
- Black Forest
- Odenwald
- Rhenish Massif, including Ardennes
- Harz
- Bohemian Massif
- Massif Central
- Armorican Massif
- Morvan
- Maures Massif
- Estérel Massif
- Corsica (southern part)
- Sardinia (Gennargentu)
- Ural Mountains
- Southwest Ireland
- Portugal and western Spain
- Măcin Mountains (Dobrogea, Romania)
- Moroccan Meseta: Central Moroccan Massif, Rehamna, Jebilet
- Mauritanides (North Africa)
- Appalachian Mountains (Alleghanian orogeny, North America)

The Variscan orogeny partly overlapped with the Acadian orogeny, which shaped the Appalachians. Its northwest-southeast (Armorican) and northeast-southwest (Variscan) branches form a characteristic "Hercynian V" pattern. European Hercynian massifs primarily consist of Carboniferous granites, metamorphic rocks (gneiss, micaschist), and locally quartzite and Carboniferous coal deposits.

== Formation ==
The Variscan orogeny unfolded over several phases, broadly divided into pre-collision and post-collision stages. During the pre-Variscan phase, from the Cambrian to Ordovician (550–450 Ma), widespread extension fragmented the supercontinent Rodinia, separating Northern Europe from Gondwana. This created a vast marine region, thinning the continental crust (e.g., Laurentia, Baltica, Kazakhstania, Siberia) and forming oceanic crust in the Iapetus, Rheic, and Centralian oceans.

In the eo-Variscan phase, from the late Ordovician to Silurian (450–400 Ma), extension gave way to plate convergence, leading to the collision of Gondwana in the south with the Euro-American continent (Laurentia-Baltica) in the north, involving intermediate plates like Avalonia and Armorica. Subduction of the African plate margin beneath the Euro-American plate closed the Rheic Ocean and Centralian Ocean, producing arc magmatism and high-pressure, high-temperature metamorphism as continental and oceanic lithosphere was buried beyond 100 km. Basic magmatic rocks transformed into eclogites, and acidic rocks into granulites.

During the meso-Variscan phase, from the early to mid-Devonian (380–340 Ma), continental collision between Laurussia and Gondwana caused obduction of oceanic material onto continental crust. This phase featured high-pressure, medium-temperature metamorphism and significant deformation, including thrusting and nappe tectonics.

In the neo-Variscan phase, from the late Devonian to late Carboniferous (380–290 Ma), nappe tectonics stacked metamorphic units, creating relief comparable to the modern Alps. The thickened crust—nearly double its normal thickness—caused thermal perturbations, (Note: The abundance of radioactive elements (uranium, thorium) in crustal material generated significant heat, increasing the geothermal gradient and causing post-thickening thermal relaxation.) leading to partial melting (anatexis) and widespread plutonism (granite formation), alongside medium-pressure, medium-temperature metamorphism. The unstable, thickened crust underwent isostatic thinning, driven by gravitational collapse or changes in plate kinematics. This late-orogenic extension, lasting into the Permian, involved tangential tectonics, intense erosion exposing lower crustal rocks, and the formation of sedimentary basins filled with material from bordering faults, volcanic flows, and calderas.

== See also ==
- Geology of France
- Geology of Germany
- Geology of the Iberian Peninsula
