= Décollement =

Geological feature

Fig. 1 Imbricate fan in a thrust system with a basal décollement. The section below the décollement is undeformed basement rock. Above the décollement, deformation has occurred due to compression. A series of branching faults terminating at depth.

Décollement (from French décoller 'to detach from') is a gliding plane between two rock masses, also known as a basal detachment fault. Décollements are a deformational structure, resulting in independent styles of deformation in the rocks above and below the fault. They are associated with both compressional settings (involving folding and overthrusting) and extensional settings.

== Origin ==
The term was first used by geologists studying the structure of the Swiss Jura Mountains, coined in 1907 by A. Buxtorf, who released a paper that theorized that the Jura is the frontal part of a décollement at the base of a nappe, rooted in the faraway Swiss Alps. Marcel Alexandre Bertrand published a paper in 1884 that dealt with Alpine nappism. Thin-skinned tectonics was implied in that paper but the actual term was not used until Buxtorf's 1907 publication.

== Formation ==
Décollements are caused by surface forces, which 'push' at converging plate boundaries, facilitated by body forces (gravity sliding). Mechanically weak layers in strata allow the development of stepped thrusts (either over- or underthrusts), which originate at subduction zones and emerge deep in the foreland. Rock bodies with differing lithologies have different characteristics of tectonic deformation. They can behave in a brittle manner above the décollement surface, with intense ductile deformation below the décollement surface. Décollement horizons may be at depths as great as 10 km and form due to high compressibility between differing rock bodies or along planes of high pore pressures.

Typically, the basal detachment of the foreland part of a fold-thrust belt lies in a weak shale or evaporite at or near the basement. Rocks above the décollement are allochthonous, rocks below are autochthonous. If material is transported along a décollement greater than 2 km, it may be considered a nappe. The faulting and folding that occurs with a regional basal detachment may be referred to as "thin-skinned tectonics", but décollements occur in 'thick-skinned' deformational regimes as well.

== Compressional setting ==
In a fold-thrust belt, the décollement is the lowest detachment (see Fig 1.) and forms in the foreland basin of a subduction zone. A fold-thrust belt may contain other detachments above the décollement—an imbricate fan of thrust faults and duplexes as well as other detachment horizons. In compressional settings, the layer directly above the décollement will develop more intense deformation than other layers, and weaker deformation below the décollement.

=== Effect of friction ===
Décollements are responsible for duplex formation, the geometry of which greatly influences the dynamics of the thrust wedge. The amount of friction along the décollement affects the shape of the wedge; a low-angle slope reflects a low-friction décollement, whereas a higher-angle slope reflects a higher-friction basal detachment.

=== Types of folding ===
Two different types of folding may occur at a décollement. Concentric folding is identified by uniform bed thickness throughout the fold, and is necessarily accompanied by detachment or a décollement as part of the deformation that occurs with a thrust fault. Disharmonic folding does not have uniform bed thickness throughout the fold.

Décollement formation in an extensional setting. Décollements can form from high angle normal faults. Uplift in a second stage of extension allows the exhumation of a metamorphic core complex. A half graben forms, but stress orientation is not perturbed due to high fault friction. Next, elevated pore pressure (Pp) leads to low effective friction that forces σ1 to be parallel to the fault in the footwall. A low-angle fault forms and is ready to act as a décollement. Then, the upper crust is thinned above the décollement by normal faulting. New high-angle faults control propagation of the décollement and help crustal exhumation. Finally, major and rapid horizontal extension lifts the terrain isostatically and isothermally. A décollement develops as an antiform that migrates toward shallower depths.

== Extensional setting ==
Décollements in extensional settings are accompanied by tectonic denudation and high cooling rates. They can form by several methods:

1. The megalandslide model predicts extension with normal faults near the original fault source and shortening further away from the source.
2. The in situ model predicts numerous normal faults overlying one large décollement.
3. The rooted, low angle normal fault model predicts that the décollement is created when two thin sheets of rock decouple at depth. Near the thickest part of the upper plate, extensional faulting may be negligible or absent, but as the upper plate thins, it loses its ability to remain coherent and may behave as a thin-skinned extensional terrane.
4. Décollements can form from high angle normal faults. Uplift in a second stage of extension allows the exhumation of a metamorphic core complex (see Fig. 2). A half graben forms, but stress orientation is not perturbed due to high fault friction. Next, elevated pore pressure (Pp) leads to low effective friction that forces σ1 to be parallel to the fault in the footwall. A low-angle fault forms and is ready to act as décollement. Then, the upper crust is thinned above the décollement by normal faulting. New high-angle faults control the propagation of the décollement and help crustal exhumation. Finally, major and rapid horizontal extension lifts the terrain isostatically and isothermally. A décollement develops as an antiform that migrates toward shallower depths.

== Examples ==
=== Jura Décollement ===
Located in the Jura Mountains, north of the Alps, it was originally thought to be a folded décollement nappe. The thin-skinned nappe was sheared off on 1000 meter-thick deposits of Triassic evaporites. The frontal basal detachment of the Jura fold-and-thrust belt forms the most external limit of the Alpine orogenic wedge with the youngest fold-and-thrust activity. The Mesozoic and Cenozoic cover of the fold-and-thrust belt and the adjacent Molasse Basin have been deformed over the weak basal décollement and displaced by some 20 km and more toward the northwest.

=== Appalachian-Ouachita Décollement ===
The Appalachian-Ouachita orogen along the southeastern margin of the North American craton includes a late Paleozoic fold-thrust belt with a thin-skinned flat-and-ramp geometry, related to lateral and vertical variations in rock lithologies. The décollement surface varies along and across strike. Promontories and embayments in the late Precambrian-early Paleozoic rifted margin are preserved in the décollement geometry.
