= Foreland basin =

Structural basin that develops adjacent and parallel to a mountain belt

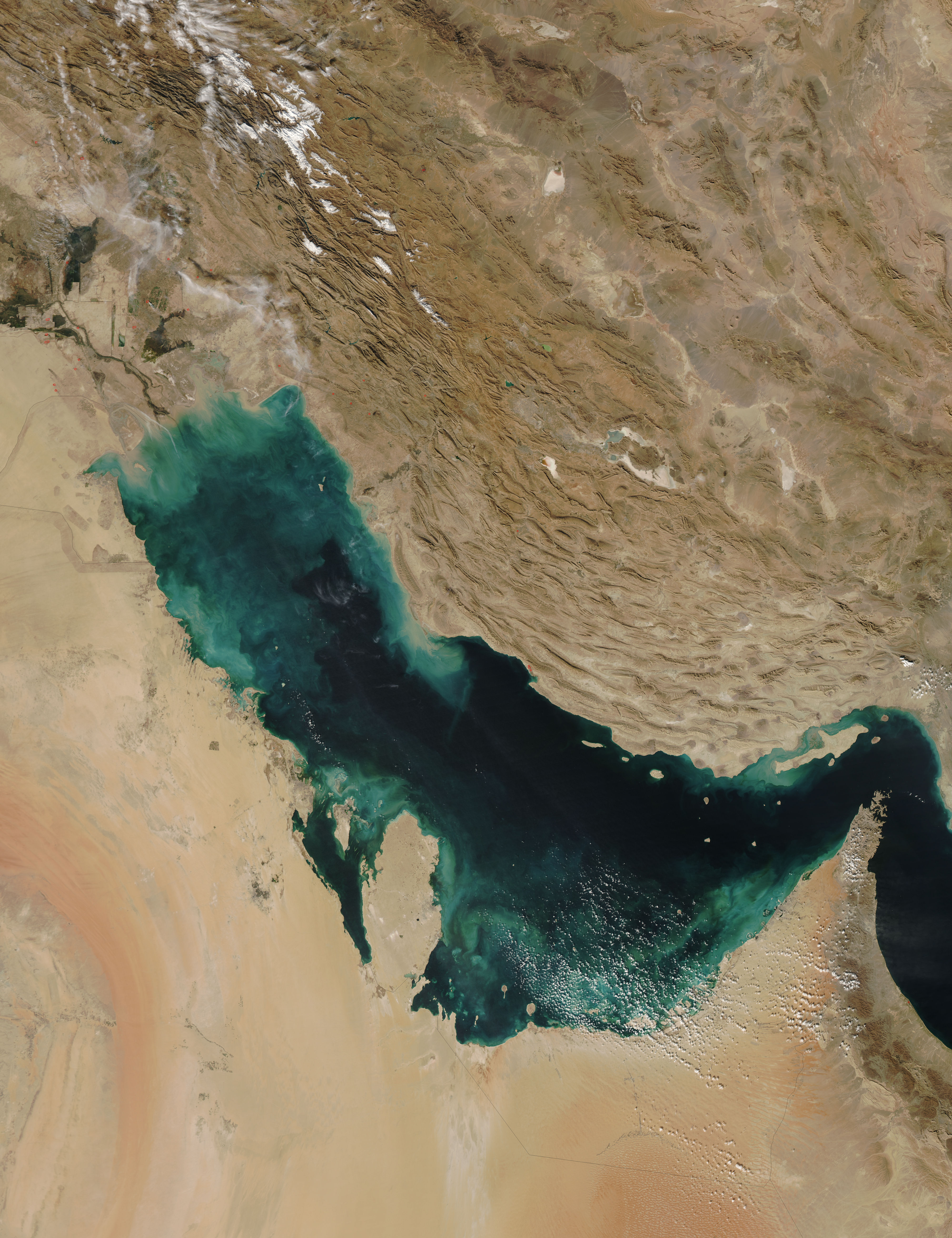
The Persian Gulf – the foreland basin produced by the Zagros orogenic belt

A foreland basin is a structural basin that develops adjacent and parallel to a mountain belt. Foreland basins form because the immense mass created by crustal thickening associated with the evolution of a mountain belt causes the lithosphere to bend, by a process known as lithospheric flexure. The width and depth of the foreland basin is determined by the flexural rigidity of the underlying lithosphere, and the characteristics of the mountain belt. The foreland basin receives sediment that is eroded off the adjacent mountain belt, filling with thick sedimentary successions that thin away from the mountain belt. Foreland basins represent an endmember basin type, the other being rift basins. Accommodation (the space available for sediments to be deposited) is provided by loading and downflexure to form foreland basins, in contrast to rift basins, where accommodation space is generated by lithospheric extension.

== Types of foreland basin ==
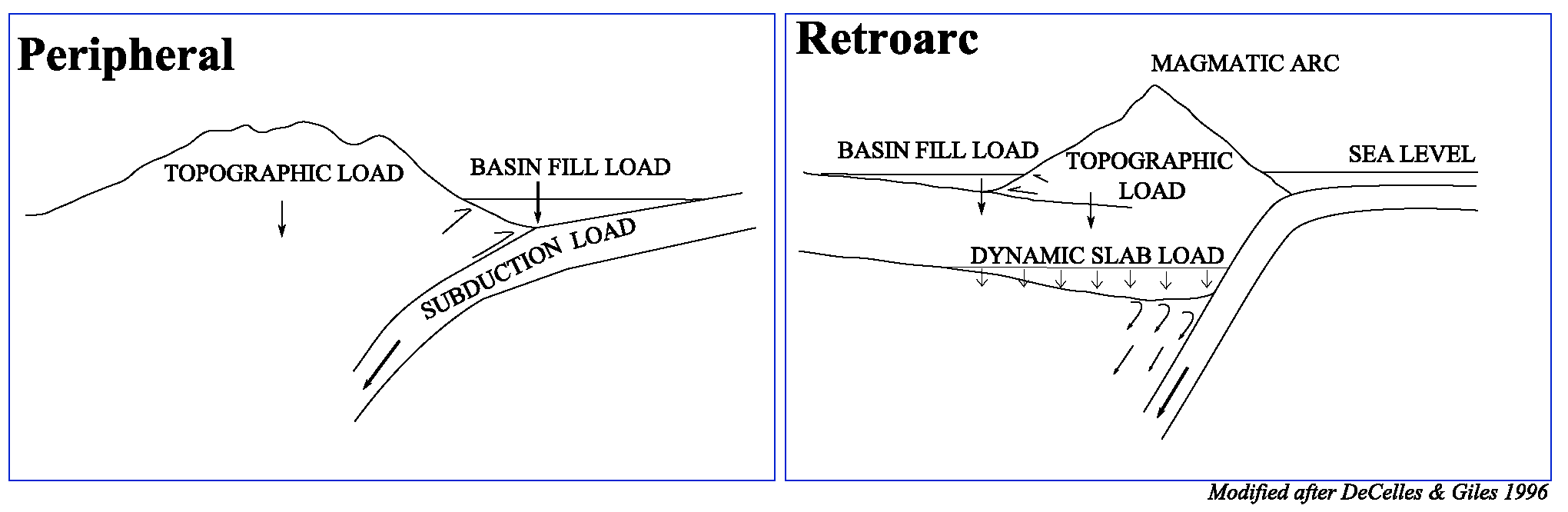
Foreland Basin Classes: Peripheral vs. Retroarc

Foreland basins can be divided into two categories:

- Peripheral (Pro) foreland basins, which occur on the plate that is subducted or underthrust during plate collision (i.e. the outer arc of the orogen)
  - Examples include the North Alpine Foreland Basin of Europe, or the Ganges Basin of Asia
- Retroarc (Retro) foreland basins, which occur on the plate that overrides during plate convergence or collision (i.e. situated behind the magmatic arc that is linked with the subduction of oceanic lithosphere)
  - Examples include the Andean basins, or Late Mesozoic to Cenozoic Rocky Mountain Basins of North America

== Foreland basin system ==
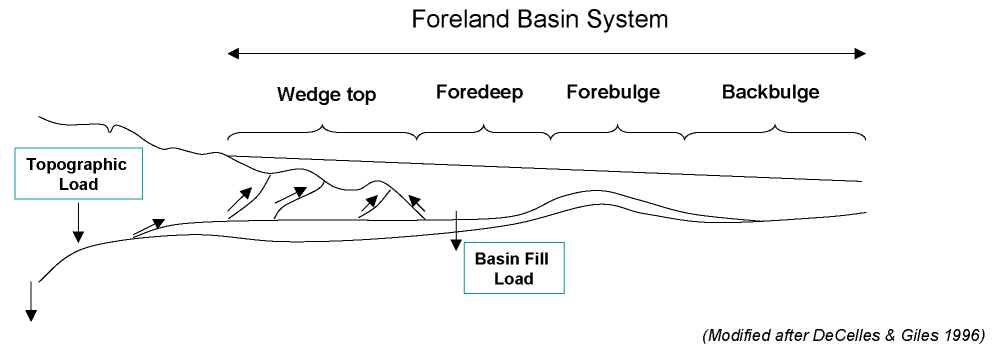
The Foreland Basin System

DeCelles & Giles (1996) provide a thorough definition of the foreland basin system. Foreland basin systems comprise three characteristic properties:

1. An elongate region of potential sediment accommodation that forms on continental crust between a contractional orogenic belt and the adjacent craton, mainly in response to geodynamic processes related to subduction and the resulting peripheral or retroarc fold-thrust belt;
2. It consists of four discrete depozones, referred to as the wedge-top, foredeep, forebulge and back-bulge depozones (depositional zones) – which of these depozones a sediment particle occupies depends on its location at the time of deposition, rather than its ultimate geometric relationship with the thrust belt;
3. The longitudinal dimension of the foreland basin system is roughly equal to the length of the fold-thrust belt, and does not include sediment that spills into remnant ocean basins or continental rifts (impactogens).

=== Foreland basin systems: depozones ===
The wedge-top sits on top of the moving thrust sheets and contains all the sediments charging from the active tectonic thrust wedge. This is where piggyback basins form.

The foredeep is the thickest sedimentary zone and thickens toward the orogen. Sediments are deposited via distal fluvial, lacustrine, deltaic, and marine depositional systems.

The forebulge and backbulge are the thinnest and most distal zones and are not always present. When present, they are defined by regional unconformities as well as aeolian and shallow-marine deposits.

Sedimentation is most rapid near the moving thrust sheet. Sediment transport within the foredeep is generally parallel to the strike of the thrust fault and basin axis.

== Plate motion and seismicity ==
The motion of the adjacent plates of the foreland basin can be determined by studying the active deformation zone with which it is connected. Today GPS measurements provide the rate at which one plate is moving relative to another. It is also important to consider that present day kinematics are unlikely to be the same as when deformation began. Thus, it is crucial to consider non-GPS models to determine the long-term evolution of continental collisions and in how it helped develop the adjacent foreland basins.

Comparing both modern GPS (Sella et al. 2002) and non-GPS models allows deformation rates to be calculated. Comparing these numbers to the geologic regime helps constrain the number of probable models as well as which model is more geologically accurate within a specific region.

Seismicity determines where active zones of seismic activity occur as well as measure the total fault displacements and the timing of the onset of deformation.

== Formation of basins ==
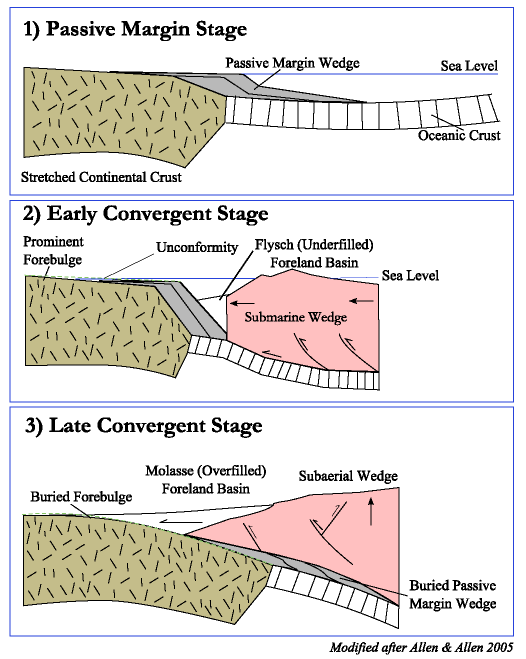
Generalized Foreland Basin System Evolution

Foreland basins form because as the mountain belt grows, it exerts a significant mass on the Earth's crust, which causes it to bend, or flex, downwards. This occurs so that the weight of the mountain belt can be compensated by isostasy at the upflex of the forebulge.

The plate tectonic evolution of a peripheral foreland basin involves three general stages. First, the passive margin stage with orogenic loading of previously stretched continental margin during the early stages of convergence. Second, the "early convergence stage defined by deep water conditions", and lastly a "later convergent stage during which a subaerial wedge is flanked with terrestrial or shallow marine foreland basins".

The temperature underneath the orogen is much higher and weakens the lithosphere. Thus, the thrust belt is mobile and the foreland basin system becomes deformed over time. Syntectonic unconformities demonstrate simultaneous subsidence and tectonic activity.

Foreland basins are filled with sediments which erode from the adjacent mountain belt. In the early stages, the foreland basin is said to be underfilled. During this stage, deep water and commonly marine sediments, known as flysch, are deposited. Eventually, the basin becomes completely filled. At this point, the basin enters the overfilled stage and deposition of terrestrial clastic sediments occurs. These are known as molasse. Sediment fill within the foredeep acts as an additional load on the continental lithosphere.

== Lithospheric behavior ==
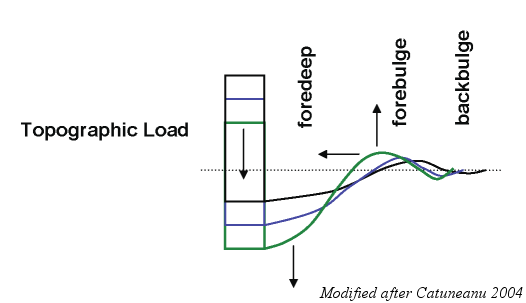
Moving Load System – Lithospheric flexure over time

Although the degree to which the lithosphere relaxes over time is still controversial, most workers accept an elastic or visco-elastic rheology to describe the lithospheric deformation of the foreland basin. Allen & Allen (2005) describe a moving load system, one in which the deflection moves as a wave through the foreland plate before the load system. The deflection shape is commonly described as an asymmetrical low close to the load along the foreland and a broader uplifted deflection along the forebulge. The transport rate or flux of erosion, as well as sedimentation, is a function of topographic relief.

For the loading model, the lithosphere is initially stiff, with the basin broad and shallow. Relaxation of the lithosphere allows subsidence near the thrust, narrowing of basin, forebulge toward thrust. During times of thrusting, the lithosphere is stiff and the forebulge broadens. The timing of the thrust deformation is opposite that of the relaxing of the lithosphere. The bending of the lithosphere under the orogenic load controls the drainage pattern of the foreland basin. The flexural tilting of the basin and the sediment supply from the orogen.

=== Lithospheric strength envelopes ===
Strength envelopes indicate that the rheological structure of the lithosphere underneath the foreland and the orogen are very different. The foreland basin typically shows a thermal and rheological structure similar to a rifted continental margin with three brittle layers above three ductile layers. The temperature underneath the orogen is much higher and thus greatly weakens the lithosphere. According to Zhou et al. (2003), "under compressional stress the lithosphere beneath the mountain range becomes ductile almost entirely, except a thin (about 6 km in the center) brittle layer near the surface and perhaps a thin brittle layer in the uppermost mantle." This lithospheric weakening underneath the orogenic belt may in part cause the regional lithospheric flexure behavior.

== Thermal history ==
Foreland basins are considered to be hypothermal basins (cooler than normal), with low geothermal gradient and heat flow. Heat flow values average between 1 and 2 HFU (40–90 mWm^{−2}. Rapid subsidence may be responsible for these low values.

Over time sedimentary layers become buried and lose porosity. This can be due to sediment compaction or the physical or chemical changes, such as pressure or cementation. Thermal maturation of sediments is a factor of temperature and time and occurs at shallower depths due to past heat redistribution of migrating brines.

Vitrinite reflectance, which typically demonstrates an exponential evolution of organic matter as a function of time, is the best organic indicator for thermal maturation. Studies have shown that present day thermal measurements of heat flow and geothermal gradients closely correspond to a regime's tectonic origin and development as well as the lithospheric mechanics.

== Fluid migration ==
Migrating fluids originate from the sediments of the foreland basin and migrate in response to deformation. As a result, brine can migrate over great distances. Evidence of long-range migration includes: 1) correlation of petroleum to distant source rocks, 2) ore bodies deposited from metal-bearing brines, 3) anomalous thermal histories for shallow sediments, 4) regional potassium metasomatism and 5) epigenetic dolomite cements in ore bodies and deep aquifers.

=== Fluid source ===
Fluids carrying heat, minerals, and petroleum, have a vast impact on the tectonic regime within the foreland basin. Before deformation, sediment layers are porous and full of fluids, such as water and hydrated minerals. Once these sediments are buried and compacted, the pores become smaller and some of the fluids, about 1/3, leave the pores. This fluid has to go somewhere. Within the foreland basin, these fluids potentially can heat and mineralize materials, as well as mix with the local hydrostatic head.

=== Major driving force for fluid migration ===
Orogen topography is the major driving force of fluid migration. The heat from the lower crust moves via conduction and groundwater advection. Local hydrothermal areas occur when deep fluid flow moves very quickly. This can also explain very high temperatures at shallow depths.

Other minor constraints include tectonic compression, thrusting, and sediment compaction. These are considered minor because they are limited by the slow rates of tectonic deformation, lithology and depositional rates, on the order of 0–10 cm yr^{−1}, but more likely closer to 1 or less than 1 cm yr^{−1}. Overpressured zones might allow for faster migration, when 1 kilometer or more of shaley sediments accumulate per 1 million years.

Bethke & Marshak (1990) state that "groundwater that recharges at high elevation migrates through the subsurface in response to its high potential energy toward areas where the water table is lower."

=== Hydrocarbon migration ===
Bethke & Marshak (1990) explain that petroleum migrates not only in response to the hydrodynamic forces that drive groundwater flow, but to the buoyancy and capillary effects of the petroleum moving through microscopic pores. Migration patterns flow away from the orogenic belt and into the cratonic interior. Frequently, natural gas is found closer to the orogen and oil is found further away.

== Modern (Cenozoic) foreland basin systems ==
=== Asia ===
- Ganges Basin
  - Pro-foreland to the south of the Himalaya, in northern India and Pakistan
  - Began to form 65 million years ago during the collision of India and Eurasia
  - Filled with a sedimentary succession more than 12 km thick
- Northern Tarim Basin
  - Pro-foreland to the south of the Tian Shan
  - Formed initially during the Late Paleozoic, during the Carboniferous and Devonian
  - Rejuvenated during the Cenozoic as a result of far field stress associated with the India-Eurasia collision and the renewed uplift of the Tian Shan
  - Thickest sedimentary section is beneath Kashgar, where Cenozoic sediment is more than 10,000 metres thick
- Southern Junggar Basin
  - Retro-foreland to the north of the Tian Shan
  - Formed initially during the Late Paleozoic and rejuvenated during the Cenozoic
  - Thickest sedimentary section is west of Urumqi, where Mesozoic sediment is more than 8,000 metres thick

==== Middle East ====
- Persian Gulf
  - Foreland to the west of the Zagros Mountains
  - Underfilled stage
  - Terrestrial part of the basin covers parts of Iraq and Kuwait

=== Europe ===
- North Alpine Basin (the Molasse Basin)
  - Peripheral foreland basin to the north of the Alps, in Austria, Switzerland, Germany and France.
  - Formed during the Palaeocene to Neogene (65.5–2.6 Ma) convergence and collision between Eurasia and the Adriatic Plate
  - Complications arise in the formation of the Rhine Graben
- Po Basin, northern Italy.
  - Retro-foreland basin of the Western and Central Southern Alps and pro-foreland of the Northern Apennines. It developed through extensional phases followed by compressional stages. Its compressional architecture is overprinted on the inherited extensional framework.
  - The compressional architecture "developed intermittently at the front of two different mountain chains, the Northern Apennines and the Southern Alps, progressively converging one towards the other."
  - There were two extensional cycles: a) Eastward pre-rift extension cycles culminating in the Anisian to Carnian (middle to early late Triassic, 247–227 Ma) cycle formation of the carbonate platform and basin system; b) Late Triassic–Liassic syn-rift extension phases related to the Piedmont-Liguria and Ionian oceanic basin spreading. After this the maximum basin widening and deepening was reached with progressive formation of the Lombardian, Belluno, and Adriatic carbonate basins.
- Veneto-Friuli foreland basin, an alluvial plain in north-eastern Italy.
  - Developed as the result of superposition of three overlapping foreland systems which differed in age and tectonic movement direction as this plain is the foreland of three surrounding chains. These are: a) the External Dinarides to the East, with Late Palaeocene to the Middle Eocene WSW vergent main deformation phases; b) the Eastern Southern Alps to the north, with mostly Middle-Late Miocene (17–7 Ma) deformation and south-directed tectonic movement; c) the Northern Apennines to the southwest, with Plio-Pleistocene (5 Ma-Recent) NE-directed deformation.
  - It is separated from the Central Western Alps and its foreland (the Po foreland basin) by the Lessini and Berici Mountains and Euganei Hills structural high, a relatively undeformed foreland block.
  - Flexure began in the Late Cretaceous with an E-ward faint bending due to the build-up of the External Dinaric thrust belt. There followed two main depositional/flexure cycles: a) the Chattian-Langhian cycle (Late Oligocene-Middle Eocene, 28–14 Ma) with a weak northward bending that accommodated sediments mainly from the uplifted and eroded axial sector of the Alps; b) the Serravallian-Early Messinian cycle (Middle to Late Miocene) with a NNW-ward prominent bending due to quick uplift of the Southern Alps. In the Pliocene-Pleistocene only the south-western-most part (southern part of the Veneto Basin) bent towards SW as result of the Northern Apennines build-up.
- Central and Southern Adriatic basins
  - Located between Italy and the Balkan Peninsula. It includes the Adriatic Sea Istria, the Gargano Promontory and the Apulian Peninsula.
  - Formed by two orogenies, the Dinarides orogeny (Latest Cretaceous, 75–66 Ma to Eocene, 56–34 Ma) and Apennine orogeny (Miocene to Pliocene (23–2.6 Ma). It is connected to the Po Basin.
- Foreland basins of the Carpathian Mountains
  - Carpathian Foredeep
    - Continuation of North Alpine Molasse Basin to the Western Carpathians, located in southern Poland and western Ukraine.
  - East Carpathian Foreland Basin
    - The foreland basin of the Eastern Carpathians which extends through southern Poland, western Ukraine, Moldova and Romania and is 800 km long. In the late Miocene to early Pliocene it was an important sediment supplier to the Dacian Basin and the Black Sea.
  - Dacian Basin
    - This is a foreland basin by the Romanian section of the Eastern Carpathians and the Southern Carpathians (also in Romania). It is a post-collisional basin which developed in the Messinian to Pliocene (7–2.6 Ma). Initially the sedimentation from this basin was mostly just in a pre-existent foredeep area. Subsequently it extended southward over the northern part of the Moesian Platform and a part of the Scythian platform.
- Ebro Basin
  - Peripheral foreland basin to the south of the Pyrenees, in northern Spain
  - Substantial deformation of the foreland basin has occurred in the north, exemplified by the foreland fold and thrust belt in the western Catalan province. The basin is well known for the spectacular exposures of syn- and post-tectonic sediment strata due to the peculiar drainage evolution of the basin.
- Guadalquivir Basin
  - Formed during the Neogene north of the Betic Cordillera (southern Spain), on a Hercynian basement.
- Aquitaine Basin
  - Retro-foreland basin to the north of the Pyrenees, in southern France

=== North America ===
- Western Canadian Sedimentary Basin
  - Foreland to the east of the Rocky Mountains, Alberta

=== South America ===
- Andean foreland basins
  - Caguán-Putumayo Basin
  - Cesar-Ranchería Basin
  - Llanos Basin
  - Magallanes Basin
  - Marañón Basin
  - Middle Magdalena Valley
  - Neuquén Basin
  - Oriente Basin
  - Ucayali Basin
  - Upper Magdalena Valley

== Ancient foreland basin systems ==
=== Asia ===
- Longmen Shan Basin
  - Foreland to the east of the Longmen Shan mountains
  - Peak evolution during the Triassic to Jurassic
- Urals Foreland
  - Foreland to the west of the Ural Mountains, in Russia
  - Formed during the Paleozoic

=== Australia ===
- Sydney Basin
  - Southernmost part of the Bowen–Gunnedah–Sydney foreland basin system of eastern Australia
  - Developed from an Early Permian extensional basin into a retroarc foreland basin associated with loading and compression along the New England Orogen
  - Contains a Permian–Triassic sedimentary succession several kilometres thick

=== Europe ===
- Windermere Supergroup
  - Foreland basin caused by subduction of Iapetus Ocean under Avalonia
  - Ordovician to Silurian in age
  - Underlies most of England

=== North America ===
- Western Interior Basin
  - Foreland to the east of the Sevier orogenic belt
  - Covered most of the western and central Northwest Territories; western and central Alberta; central and eastern Montana; Wyoming; central and eastern Utah; Colorado; central and eastern New Mexico; western Texas; eastern Chihuahua; Coahuila; eastern Durango; northern Zacatecas; Aguascalientes; eastern and central Guanajuato; western San Luis Potosí; Querétaro; and all but the western edge of Michoacán
  - Evolved during the Cretaceous
  - Deepest parts of the basin filled with the Mancos Shale
  - Most of the Bighorn Basin filled with the Thermopolis Shale
- Appalachian Basin
  - Foreland to the west of the Appalachian mountains, in Eastern United States
- Bend Arch – Fort Worth Basin
  - Pro-Foreland to the east of the Ouachita orogenic belt
  - Formed during the Paleozoic

=== South America ===
- Foreland to the east of the Central Andes orogenic belt – The Southern Chaco Foreland Basin in northern Argentina

== See also ==
- Back-arc basin
- Back-arc region
- Forearc basin
- Passive margin
