= Fold and thrust belt =

Series of mountainous foothills

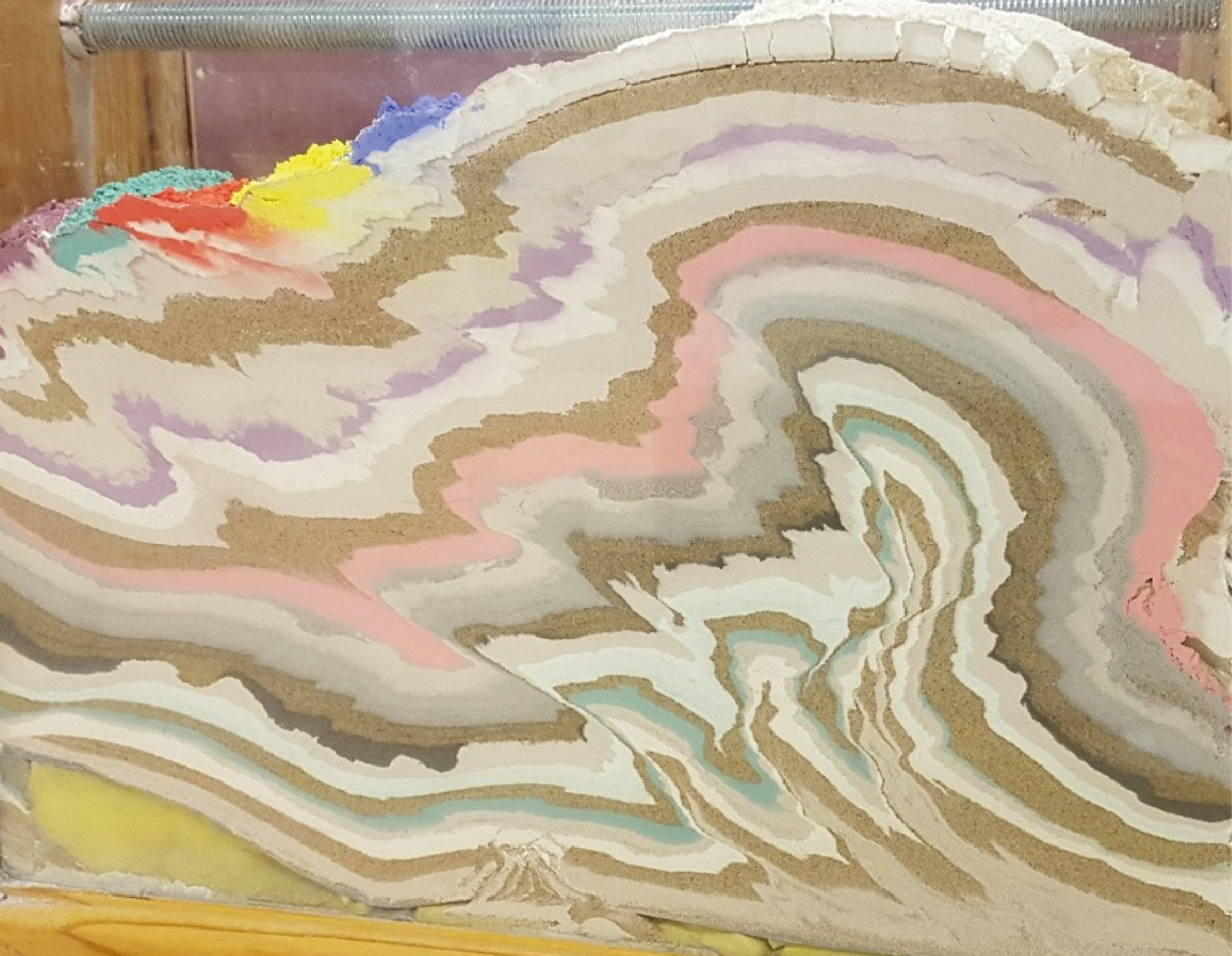
Modelling of a fold and thrust belt in a sand box

A fold and thrust belt is a series of mountainous foothills adjacent to an orogenic belt, which forms due to contractional tectonics. Fold and thrust belts commonly form in the forelands adjacent to major orogens as deformation propagates outwards. Fold and thrust belts usually comprise both folds and thrust faults, commonly interrelated. They are commonly also known as thrust-and-fold belts, or simply thrust-fold belts.

== Geometry ==
Fold and thrust belts are formed of a series of sub-parallel thrust sheets, separated by major thrust faults. As the total shortening increases in a fold and thrust belt, the belt propagates into its foreland. New thrusts develop at the front of the belt, folding the older thrusts that have become inactive. This sequential propagation of thrusts into the foreland is the most common. Thrusts that form within the belt rather than at the thrust front are known as "out-of-sequence".

=== Map view ===
In map view, fold and thrust belts are generally sinuous rather than completely linear. Where the thrust front bulges out in the direction of tectonic transport, a salient is formed. Between the bulges the areas are known as recesses, reentrants or sometimes embayments.

== Thrust belts ==
Profile through the Pyrenees. In the south a fold and thrust belt exists as sediments are folded and stacked (thrust) on top of the other.

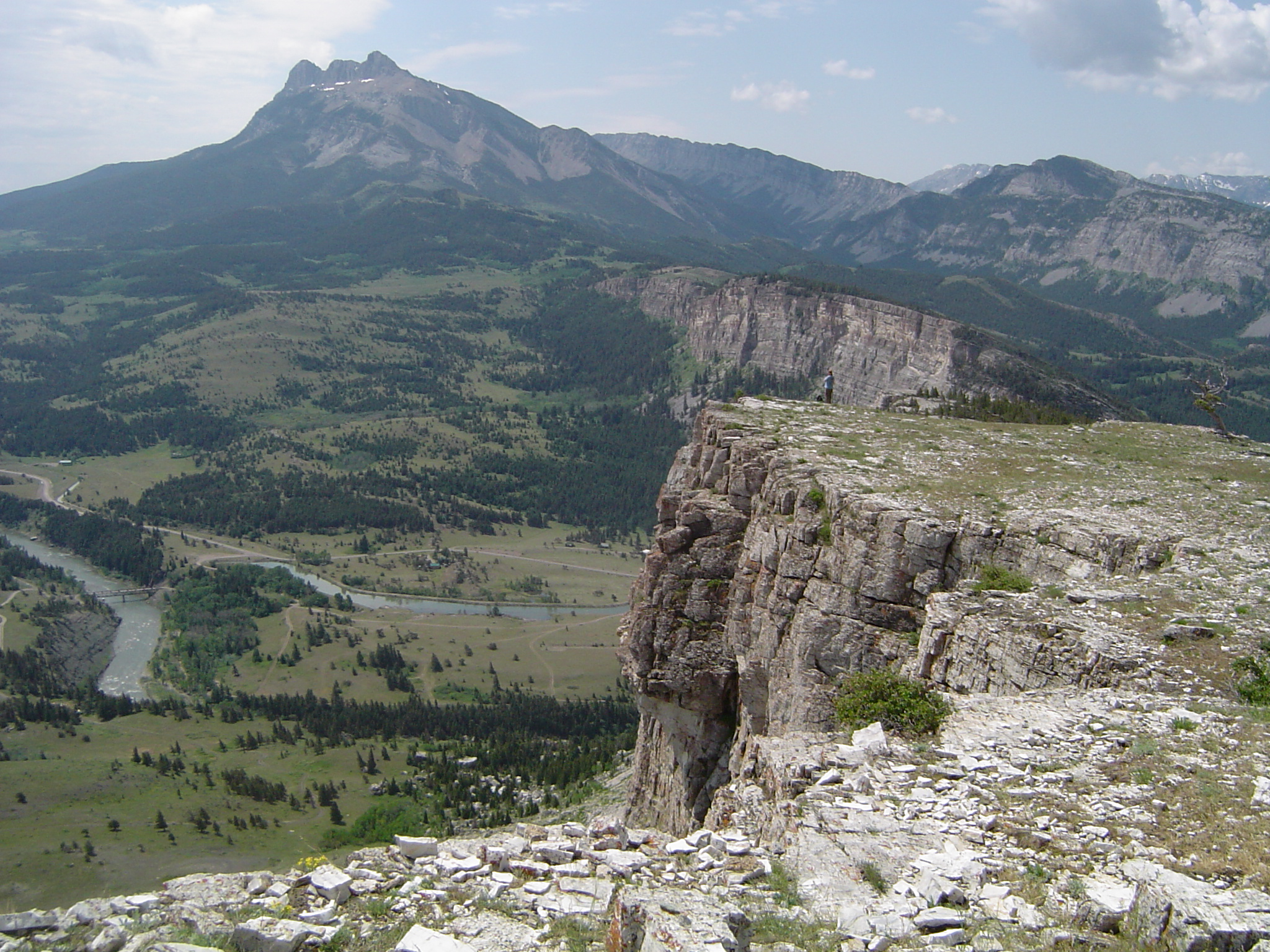
An example of thin-skinned thrusting in Montana. The white Madison Limestone is repeated, with one example in the foreground (that pinches out with distance) and another to the upper right corner and top of the picture.

=== Africa ===
Thrustbelt name	Age	Structural style
Atlas Mountains		
Cape Fold Belt		

=== Asia ===
Thrustbelt name	Age	Structural style
Aravalli Range	Precambrian	
Himalayas	Upper Cretaceous	
Zagros fold and thrust belt	Young and active deforming belt	

=== Australia ===
Thrustbelt name	Age	Structural style
Eastern Lachlan Orogen	Middle Paleozoic	North-south oriented structures

=== Europe ===
Thrustbelt name	Age	Structural style
Alps	Cenozoic	
Scandinavian Caledonides	Ordovician - Devonian	
Carpathians	Mesozoic - Tertiary	

=== North America ===
Thrustbelt name	Age	Structural style
Alaska Range	Late Cretaceous - Cenozoic	Thick-skin
Anadyr Highlands	Late Paleocene - Eocene	Unknown
Antler Thrustbelt	Carboniferous	Thin-skin
Appalachians	Late Paleozoic	Thin-skin
Arctic Cordillera	Middle Devonian - Early Carboniferous	Unknown
Brooks Range	Jurassic - Early Cretaceous, Early Cenozoic	Thin-skin
California Coast Ranges	Late Miocene - Quaternary	Transpressional
Chihuahua Belt	Paleocene	Unknown
Chugach Mountains	Cenozoic	Thin-skin
Eurekan Fold Belt	Eocene - Oligocene	Unknown
Innuitian Fold-Thrust Belt	Late Cretaceous - Early Cenozoic	Thin-skin
Kuskokwim Mountains	Late Cretaceous - Eocene	Unknown
Mackenzie Mountains	Late Cretaceous - Middle Eocene	Thin-skin
Maria Fold and Thrust Belt	Cretaceous	Thick-skin
North Greenland Fold Belt	Middle Devonian - Early Carboniferous	Unknown
Northern Ellesmere Fold Belt	Middle Devonian - Early Carboniferous	Thin-skin
Ogilvie Mountains	Late Cretaceous - Eocene	Thin-skin
Oregon Accretionary Prism	Late Miocene - Quaternary	Thin-skin
Ouachitas	Late Carboniferous - Early Permian	Thick- and thin-skin
Richardson Mountains	Late Cretaceous - Middle Eocene	Thin-skin
Rocky Mountains	Paleocene to Middle Eocene	Thick-skin
Selwyn Fold Belt, Yukon	Late Cretaceous	Unknown
Sierra Madre Oriental	Early Cenozoic	Unknown
Sierra Madre Occidental	Cretaceous - Eocene	Unknown
South Canadian Rockies	Late Jurassic - Eocene	Thin-skin
Wyoming-Utah Thrustbelt (North Sevier)	Late Jurassic - Eocene	Thin-skin

Much of this table is adapted from Nemcok et al., 2005

=== South America ===
Thrustbelt name	Age	Structural style
Magallanes (Fuegian) fold and thrust belt	Late Cretaceous - Cenozoic	Thin-skin
Malargüe fold and thrust belt		
Marañón fold and thrust belt	Cenozoic	Thick-skin and thin-skin
Central Andean fold and thrust belt	Mesozoic - Cenozoic	Thin skin
Paipote fold and thrust belt	Cenozoic	Thick-skin and thin-skin
