= 3D fold evolution =

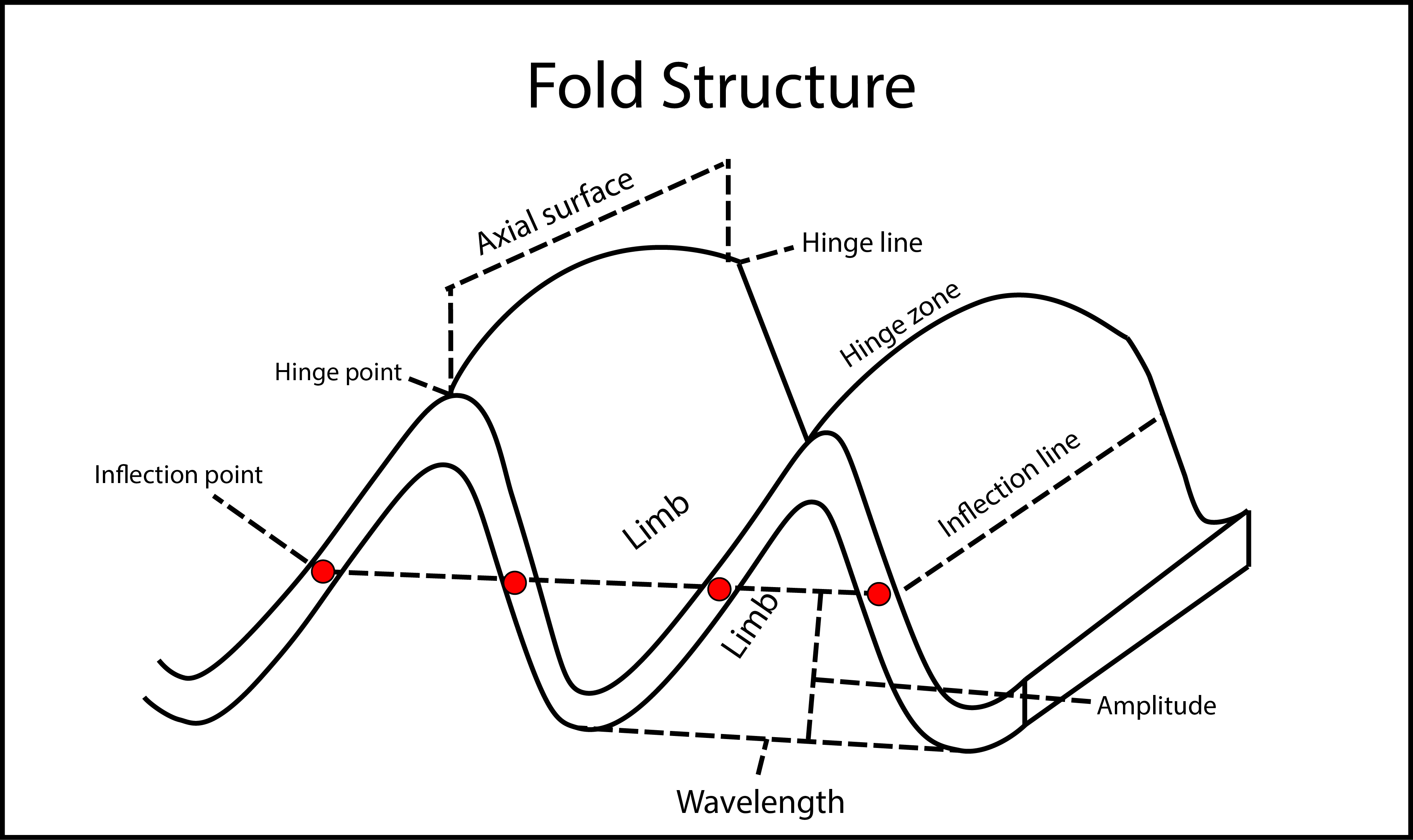
basic structure of a fold

Fig.1: 3D fold growth under compressional stress. Yellow, orange and red color represents elevation, in which lighter color refers to higher elevation.

In geology, 3D fold evolution is the study of the full three dimensional structure of a fold as it changes in time. A fold is a common three-dimensional geological structure that is associated with strain deformation under stress. Fold evolution in three dimensions can be broadly divided into two stages, namely fold growth and fold linkage. The evolution depends on fold kinematics, Fold mechanism, as well as a reporting of the history behind folds and relationships by which fold age is understood. There are several ways to reconstruct the evolution progress of folds, notably by using depositional evidence, geomorphological evidence and balanced restoration.

== 3D fold growth ==
Fig.2: Map View (upper) and cross-sectional view (lower) of fold growth

Under compressional stress, folds grow in all three dimensions, including vertical fold amplification and lateral fold propagation, both along fold crest and perpendicular to fold crests. Three-dimensional fold growth can be observed in areas like the Zagros Mountains in Iraq and Iran as well as Wheeler Ridge in California, United States.

=== Fold structure ===
The vertical dimension of a fold can be described as an amplitude. The horizontal dimension of a fold can by described by wavelength and hinge line of a fold. As a fold grows in three-dimension, amplitude, wavelength and the length of the hinge line will increase.

=== Sheath fold ===
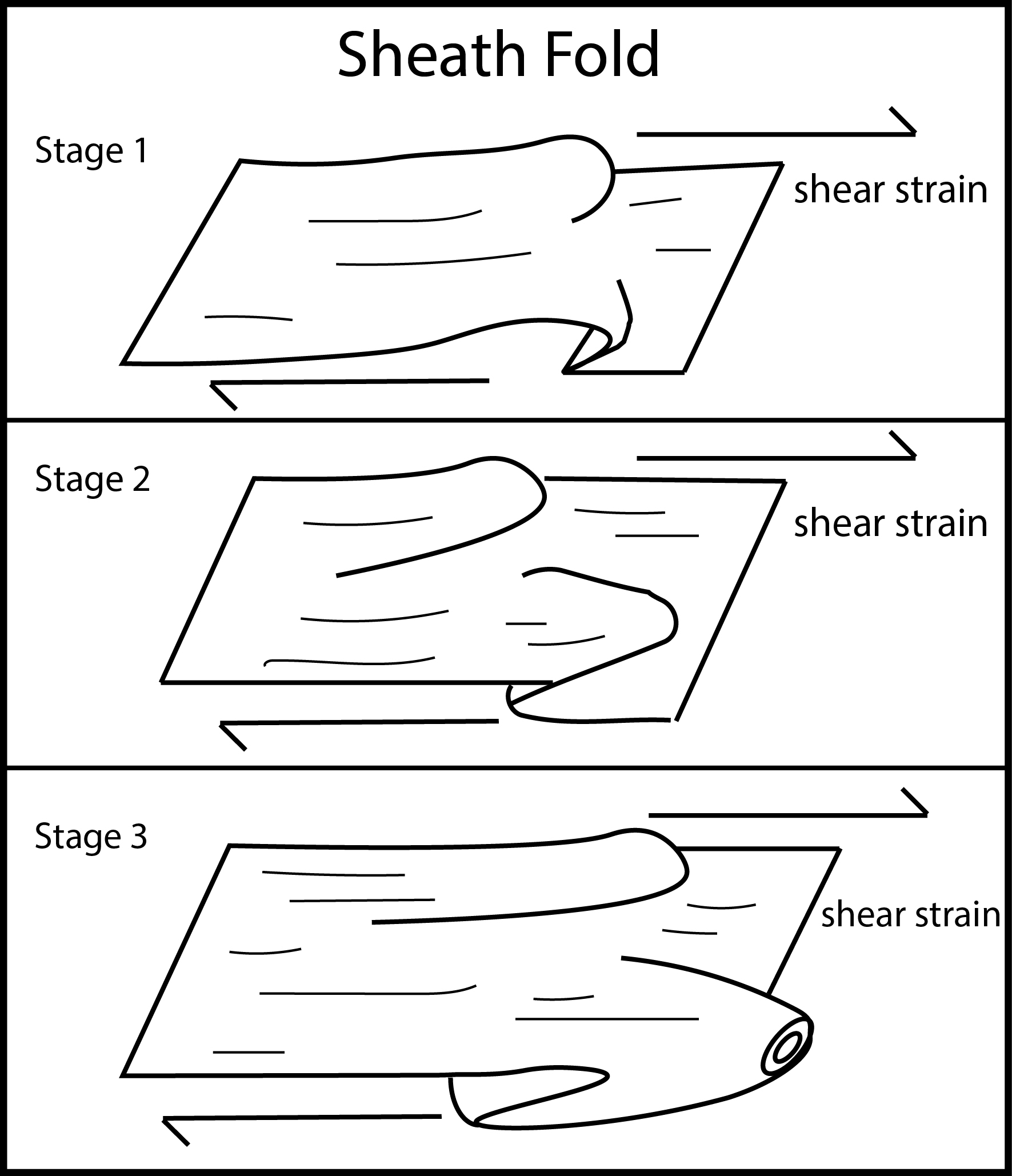
A diagram showing the structure and evolution of a sheath fold

Sheath folds form in areas where rocks react differently to simple shear, due to variations in competence across layers. The hinge line is severely bent in sheath fold.

== Fold kinematics ==
Under force, rock strata buckle occurs by one of two kinematic processes, either by hinge migration or by limb rotation.

=== Hinge migration ===
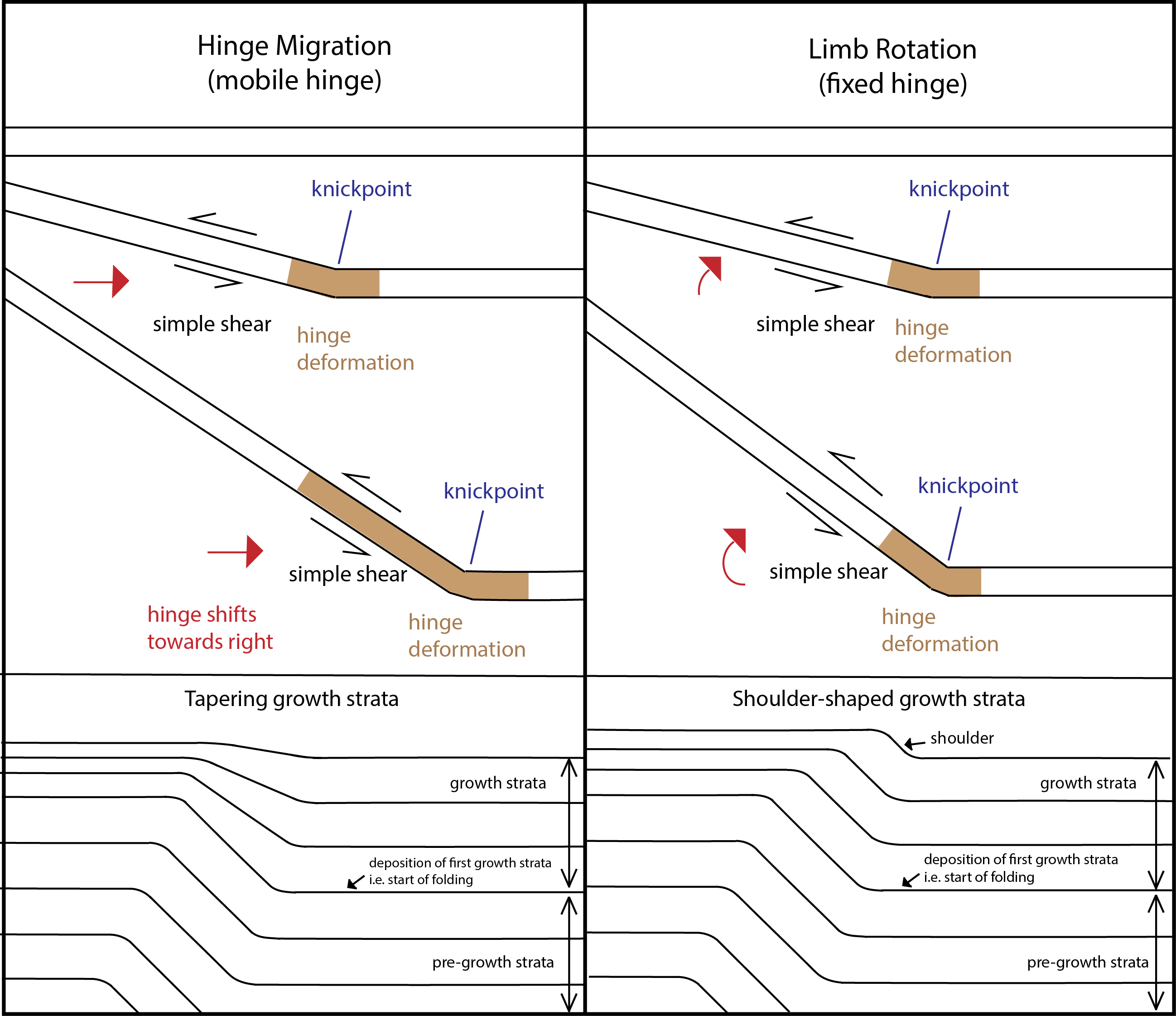
Fig.3: Illustration of twofold kinematics, hinge migration(left) and limb rotation(right) and their respective growth strata pattern.

A fold hinge can migrate when strata are folded by hinge migration but the hinge is fixed when strata are folded by limb rotation. At least one of the fold hinges in the whole fold structure is mobile during three dimensional fold growth. For example, indicated by kinematic models, the structure of a fault-propagation folds should contain three anticlines/synclines with migrating hinges and 1 anticline with fixed hinge limb rotation.

Hinge migration can be distinguished from limb rotation by several structural and geomorphological features.

Growth strata, also known as syntectonic strata, are sedimentary layers that are deposited at the same time as folding. These layers are characterized by decreasing thickness of strata towards crest of an anticline(fig 1). They exist in various geometric patterns. The variation in geometric patterns can be attributed to fold kinematics, rate of uplift and sedimentation rate.

A knickpoint is a morphological term for a section of a present or abandoned river valley that shows an abrupt change in slope, and can be attributed to differential erosion or structural deformation. They are usually associated with waterfalls and lakes.

For the definition of wind gaps, please see subsection #streams deflected around the nose of fold.

Hinge Migration VS Limb Rotation
| Structural and geomorphological features | Hinge Migration | Limb Rotation |
|---|---|---|
| Pattern of growth strata | Shoulder-shaped | Gradual tapering |
| Hinge deformation | At limb and hinge | Only near fixed hinge |
| Knickpoint | Shifting along direction of hinge migration | Fixed position |
| Wind gaps | Multiple wind gaps can be formed from a single river | Unlikely to form more than one wind gaps |

== Fold mechanism ==
Folds that may experience prolonged 3D growth can be divided into two groups according to their causes, namely detachment fold and forced fold. They are mainly differentiated by the presence of major fault control on fold structure in forced folds, and the absence of it in detachment folds. Fold causes that do not contribute to significant fold growth in all three dimensions, such as en-echelon folds, drag folds and rollover anticline are not in these groups. Understanding the evolution of folds is important because it helps petroleum geologists to gain a better understanding on the distribution of structural traps of hydrocarbon.

=== Detachment fold ===
Fig.4: A short demonstration of the concept of evolution of detachment fold. Table: competent rock unit; Paper: incompetent rock unit; Decollement: interface between paper and table.

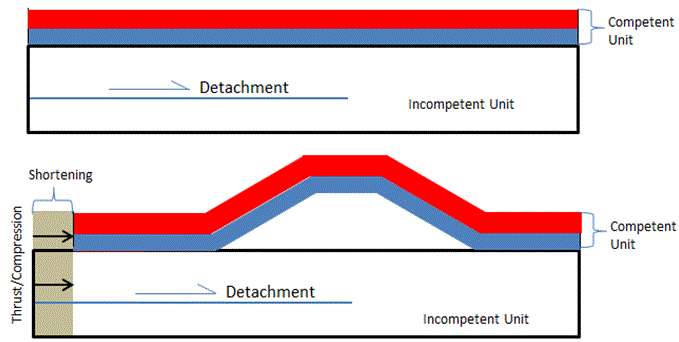
Fig.5: A model of detachment fold. Decollement can either develop along bedding in the incompetent layer, as shown here, or along the interface of competent and incompetent layer.

As shown in the visual analogy for detachment folds in fig 4, folds are found in rock strata above the decollement (paper: incompetent) while rock strata below it (table: competent, if it deforms it will fracture) remains undeformed, as shortening strain is concentrated at the rock strata above decollement. In a setting in which overlapping strata acquires contrasting competency, a decollement (interface between paper and table) is usually found along strata in competent rock unit (such as sandstone) or along the interface of competent and incompetent rock unit (such as an evaporite). A fold acquires higher amplitude, longer wavelength and broader width when rock strata above the decollement are subjected to shortening stress parallel to, or at a low angle to the strata. Apart from stress parameters, contrast of competency across strata and variation of displacement along the decollement are the main factors contributing to fold geometry and three dimensional growth pattern.

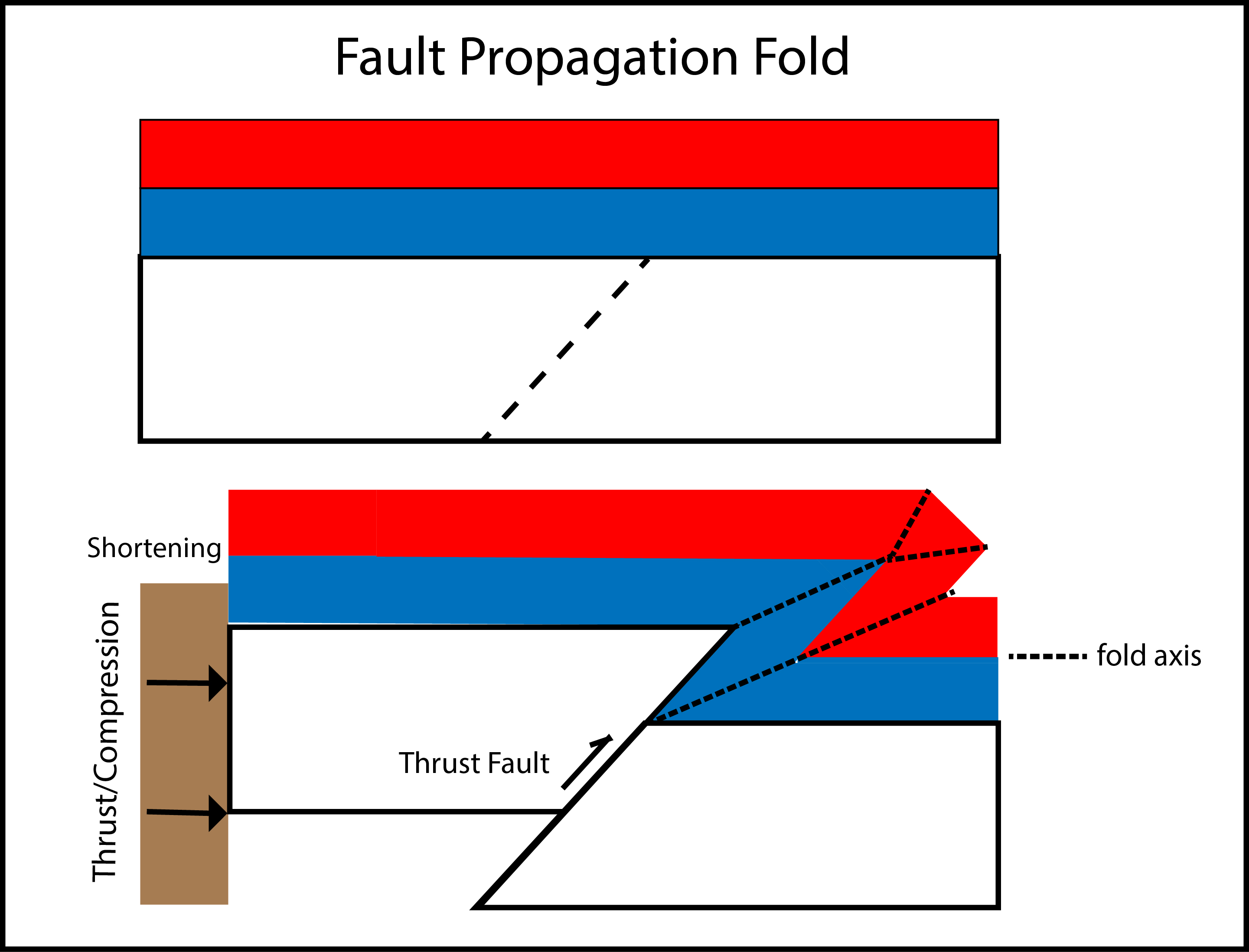
Fig.6: A model of a fault-propagation fold, an example of forced fold. Note that folding in the overlying sedimentary strata is controlled by faulting in the basement rocks.

=== Forced fold ===
Two common types of forced folds are, namely, fault-bend fold and fault-propagation fold. Folding occurs above the hanging wall of a fold ramp in a fault-bend fold, while folding occurs above the truncation of a thrust fault(fault tip) in a fault-propagation fold. They are usually highly asymmetric with one side of the limb much steeper than the other side. Shortening stress is usually at a high angle to the strata and is concentrated along the slipping plane and in the hanging wall of the thrust fault. The fold acquires higher amplitude, longer wavelength and broader width as rock slips along the fault plane of the underlying coeval thrust fault, casting major influence on the three dimensional growth of the fold. Therefore, forced folds are controlled by the fault structure in the basement rocks along planar or listric fault surfaces. The amount of fault displacement would control the amplitude of a fold, the lateral growth of fault would implies lateral growth of fold and fault linkage implies fold linkage on the surface. When compared to detachment folds, contrasting competency across strata is not as pronounced and the tectonic environments that they are found in are often more diverse.

Fig. 7: An evolutionary diagram on fault-propagation fold. Note that the fault diminishes gradually towards the top.

Fig. 8: An animation on the evolution of a fault-bend fold, Note that 2 anticlines and synclines are formed at the final stage of the progression.

A detachment fold can evolve into a forced fold when shortening stress exceeds the maximum strength of rock, and as a result the decollement may propagate upwards towards the anticlinal core and fault the detachment fold. The resultant structure poses characteristics of both detachment fold and fault propagation fold. An exemplar structure of this kind can be found in Mississippi Fan fold belt in Gulf of Mexico.

== Identification of 3D fold growth ==
=== Fold growth in cross-sectional, across fold-axis dimension ===
Modelling of the kinematic evolution of folds in cross-sectional view is usually based on one of the following schemes: balanced restoration, forward kinematic modelling or a combination of the two.

=== Fold growth in lateral dimension ===
Section restoration in all three dimension can only be done by highly specialized software and is mainly used for studies in hydrocarbon.

Alternatively, geomorphological evidences, especially drainage features, can be used to determine the lateral propagation direction of fold growth. There are 6 main criteria for identifying lateral fold growth:

==== Degree of surface dissection and drainage density along fold crest ====
Drainage density (=total river length/area of drainage basin) and degree of surface dissection decreases along with propagation direction of a fold. Higher drainage density and greater degree of surface dissection in a particular part of a fold segment corresponds to the higher maturity of that part, which can be inferred as that that part has been subjected to erosion for a longer time period after uplift. Hence, it experienced uplift relative earlier than other parts of the fold. Mathematical analysis of the maturity of drainage which take into the account of stream length and stream order can also be used to establish the relative ages of different drainage basins.

==== Progressive change of soil profile ====
Older sections of a fold experience more erosion and therefore have a different soil profile compared to their younger counterparts. Soil profiles can be classified into different stages of development according to morphological stages of carbonate horizons in soil, mass of secondary carbonate, iron oxide content, clay content, thickness of clay-film and color brightness of soil, and thus establishes lateral growth direction of the fold. Furthermore, carbon-14 or uranium-series dating of soil materials would set time constraint on certain parts of the fold and therefore helps fixing the rate of lateral fold growth.

Nevertheless, this criterion of comparison is based on an assumption that time is the only significant factor contributing to the differences of soil profiles across different parts of a fold, and excludes other factors for variation such as parent materials of soil, climate, vegetation and initial topography. Therefore, the progressive change in soil profile is more of a secondary evidence of lateral fold growth.

==== Structural relief ====
Structural elevation along fold crest should decrease along the growth direction of a fold because the older part of a fold experiences more uplift than their younger counterpart. However, this can be strongly misleading in active erosional environment where erosion rather than uplift due to fold growth is the dominant shaping force of the landscape and as a result can only be used as secondary evidence of fold growth.

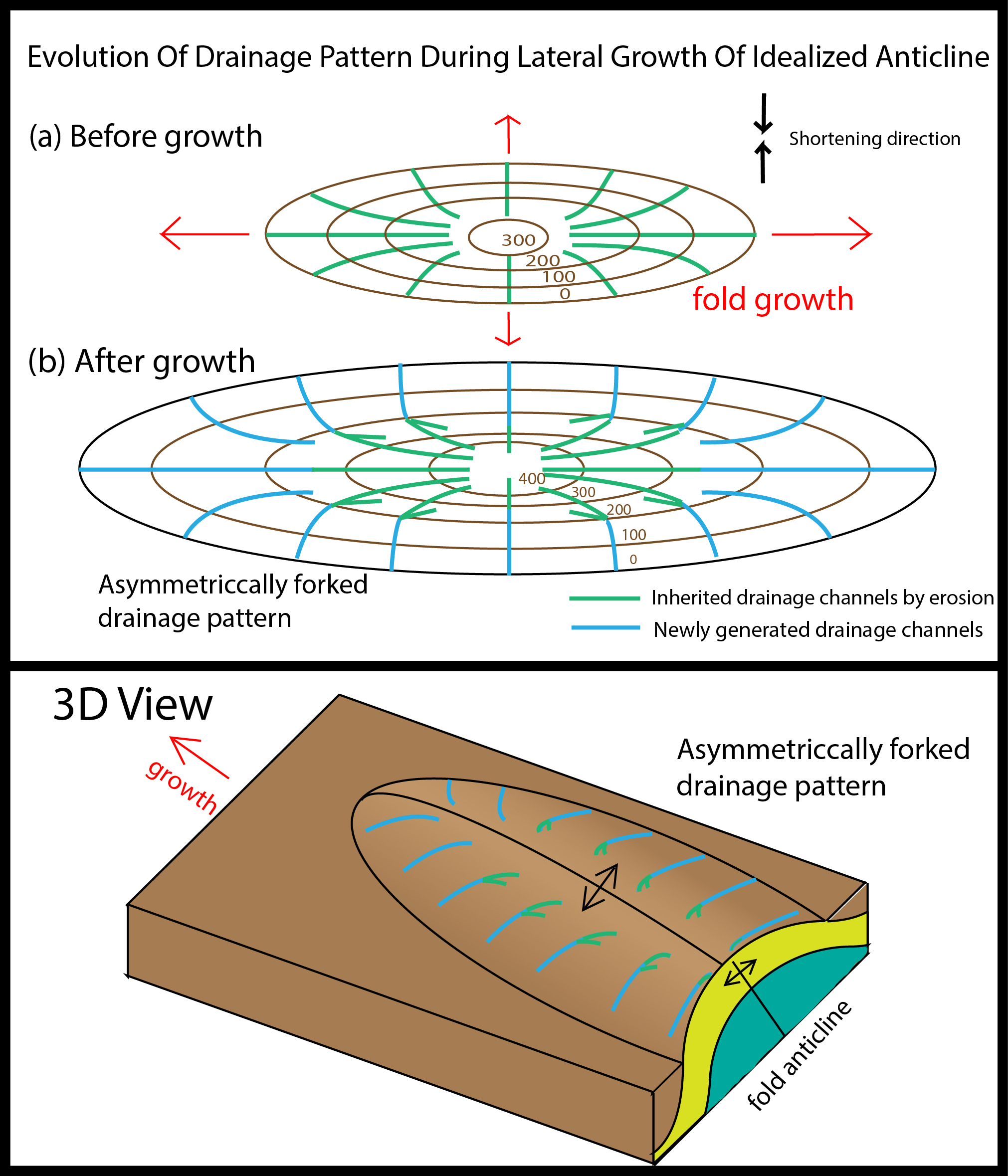
Fig. 9: Asymmetric forked drainage pattern. The diagram shows drainage pattern (a) before and (b) after lateral fold growth, as well as a 3D view of asymmetric drainage pattern. Strong erosion of river onto bedrock has preserved the old drainage valley at upper course and thus some of the first-generation drainage channels are inherited and linked with the present drainage channels. Modified after Ramsey (2008).

==== Characteristic drainage pattern on the slope of anticline ====
An asymmetric forked drainage pattern forms during lateral growth of a fold. The direction along which drainage channels 'bend away' from the fold crest is the direction of lateral fold growth(fig. 7). Imagine the following situation: at an early stage of folding and near the fold tip, river flows approximately along the fold crests towards the end of a fold as river tends to flow down the slope of maximum gradient. As folding continues, that point is no longer located at the fold tip as the fold grows laterally. As the point is uplifted to a higher elevation, the slope of maximum gradient is no longer along the fold crest, but becomes the distance from fold hinge towards the other end of fold limb, which is approximately perpendicular to the original orientation. As a result, the new generation of river flows perpendicular to the fold crest along the fold limbs. Because of strong river erosion in the upper course, some of the drainage channels of the earlier stage are deeply incised into bedrock and therefore river continues to flow along these upper parts of old channels that do not follow the maximum slope gradient. As a result, combining the fold-crest-parallel direction of flow in the upper part of drainage channels (which are inherited from the early stages of deformation) and the fold-crest-perpendicular direction of flow in the middle and lower of drainage channels, an asymmetric drainage pattern that resembles a bent fork results. This criterion is a strong evidence for lateral fold growth.

==== Streams deflected around the nose of fold ====
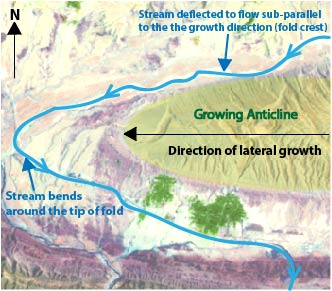
Fig.10: Stream got deflected to flow sub-parallel to fold crest and bend around the tip of the growing fold, hinting a westward direction of lateral fold growth. Image: Landsat ETM+7

Fig.11: Schematic diagram showing deflection of a river during lateral fold growth. Blue line: river; Light blue line: wind gap

Streams are deflected as they meet uplifted rocks and flow along the boundary of the fold, which is parallel or sub-parallel to fold axis and the curvature of the deflected stream convex towards the direction of lateral fold growth along fold crest.

There are two possible scenarios when the path of a stream is blocked by an uplifted block of rock. First scenario: the stream poses stream power that is high enough to cut through the uplifted rocks, so that the river course will not be significantly altered. A channel is opened in the uplifted rocks due to erosion, a landform known as water gap. It continues to flow until the rock is further uplifted and the river no longer has enough erosive power to cut through it, leading to the second scenario. Second scenario: the stream does not have enough erosive power to cut through the rocks, so it deflected to flow along the boundary of the uplifted block as aforementioned. The abandoned river channel is known as wind gap. From here, the river either flows along the boundary of the fold and bends around the fold tip, or it may cut through the rocks at some points despite the block, due to either, acquisition of enough stream power through stream capture of small tributaries along its flow, or the presence of a particularly weak spot in the rock. In either way the river continues to flow until further uplift of rocks makes the rock too difficult for the river to cut through, which results in, again, the deflection of the channel and formation of a new wind gap.

==== Wind gaps ====
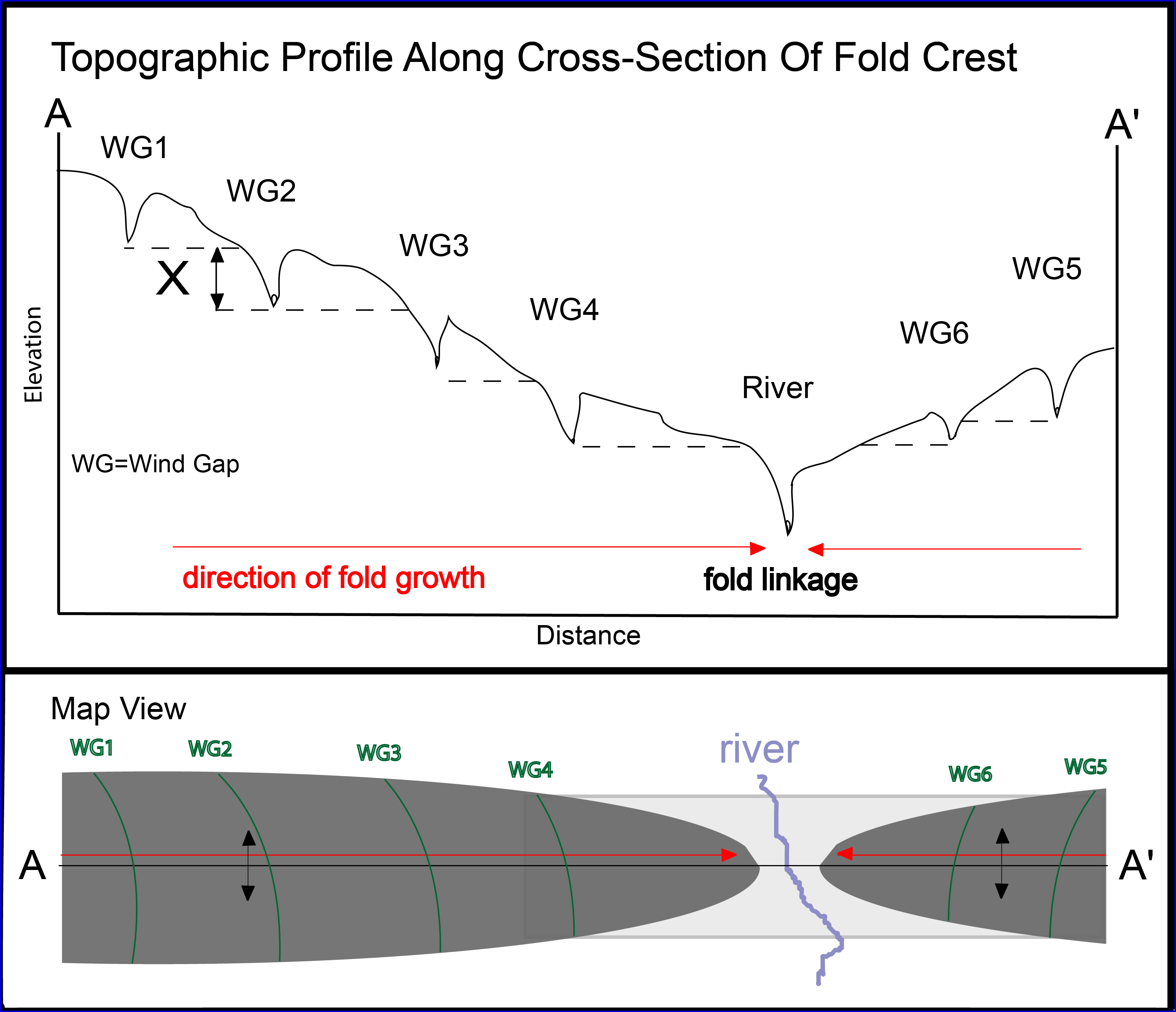
Fig. 12: The upper diagram shows a cross-section A-A' along the fold crests of two growing folds. The lower part shows a map view of the region. WG=wind gap. Red arrows: direction of lateral fold growth; Wind gap elevation decreases along lateral fold growth direction and curvatures of wind gaps convex towards lateral fold growth direction. The 2 fold segments grow towards each other and merge. Asymmetric forked drainage patterns are delineated on the fold segments. Modified from Hetzel (2004), He and Li (2009) and Ramsey (2008).

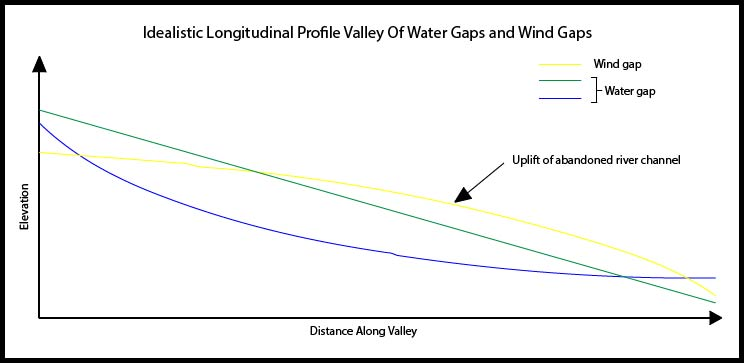
Fig. 13: Idealized river profiles of water gap and wind gap respectively. Yellow line – wind gap; Blue line and green line – water gap. Note that this is a highly idealized diagram and the actual profile of both wind and water gap should be much more rugged and irregular, though the average trend will be similar to the diagram. Based on He and Li (2009).

Elevation of wind gaps decreases along the growth direction of fold and curvature of curved wind gaps convex towards the growth direction of the fold. Multiple wind gaps can be formed from a single river if there is continuous lateral fold growth and the river keeps being deflected, by abandoning its earlier channel and forming a new one around the outside of the developing fold. In a topographic profile along fold crest, wind gaps appears as deep, narrow v-shaped valley. The incision depth of a wind gap correspond to the period of active river erosion before the channel was abandoned, i.e. the duration of its state of being a river or water gap. Since the time of abandonment of an old river channel(time of formation of a new wind gap) is the time of formation of a new river channel and the start of erosion in the new channel, the base elevation of a wind gap would approximately equals to the surface elevation of its successor, provided that they were formed from the same river. Therefore, the elevation of wind gaps must always decrease along the direction of lateral fold growth along fold crest, which is one of the strongest, although not decisive, evidence of the characteristics of fold growth. As former deflected streams, some of the wind gaps may show curvature that convex towards the direction of lateral fold growth.

In a Digital Elevation Model(DEM), the longitudinal profile of a wind gap shows a convex-upwards trend and that of a water gap shows a concave-upwards or linear trend.

None of the single aforementioned methodologies is decisive on determining 3D fold growth and a combination of methodologies should be used, because similar morphology can be produced by limb rotation and differential erosion across strata of varying competency, which do not implicate three-dimensional fold growth.

=== Wheeler Ridge, California ===
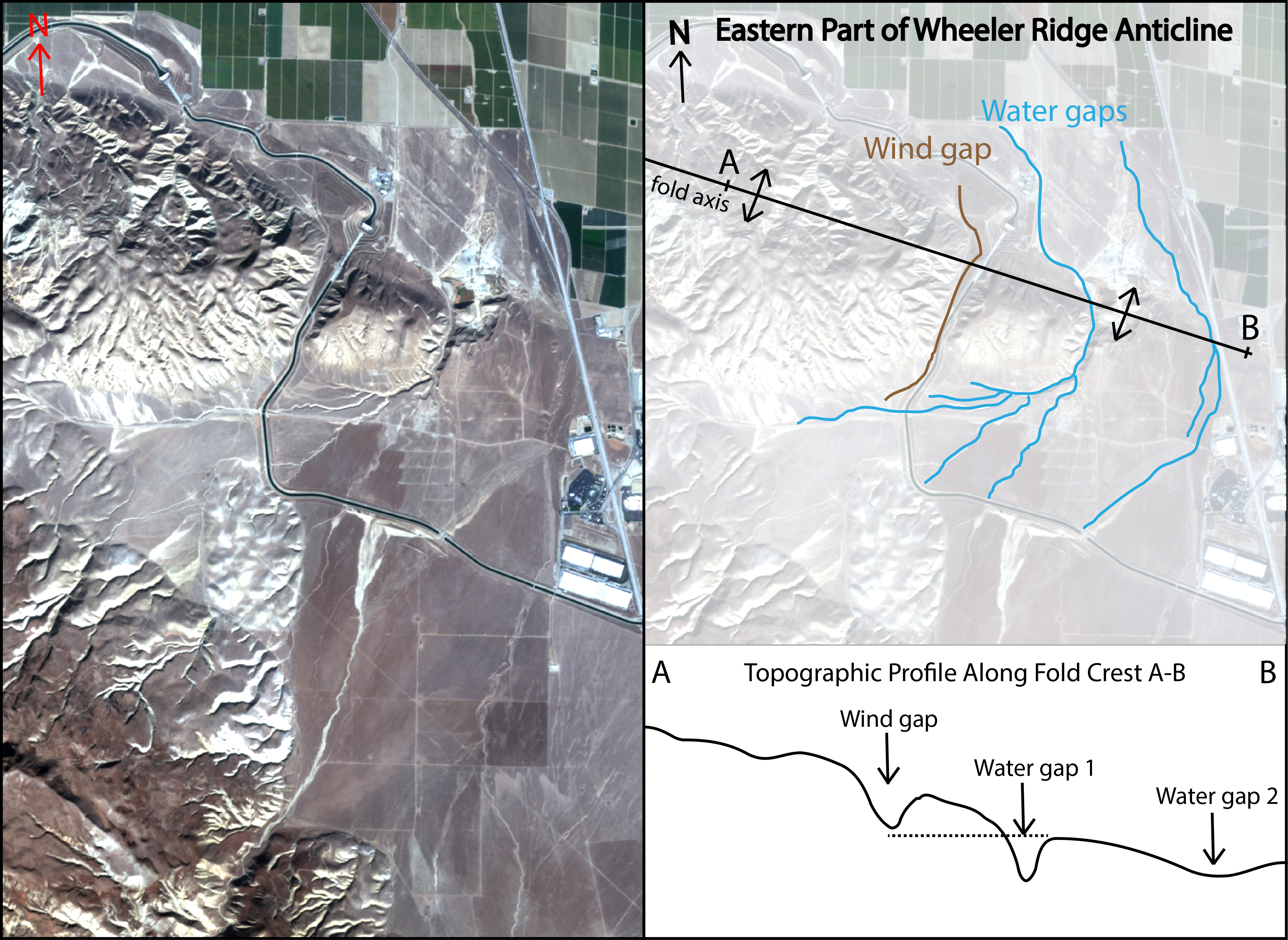
Fig. 14 Left: Sentinel Satellite Image of area of Wheeler Ridge, CA. Right: Showing water gaps and wind gap at the eastern part of Wheeler Ridge anticline and topographic profile A-B across the fold crest. Brown line: fold hinge; Blue line: river/water gap; Brown line: wind gap

Located at southern California, Wheeler Ridge anticline is an east–west trending fault-bend fold, and is part of Pleito-Wheeler Ridge thrust fault system. Structural deformation in the area has been active since late Pleistocene, resulting in significant three-dimensional fold growth.

The eastern end of the anticline has been experiencing fold growth towards the east-southeast.

Firstly, the structural elevation of eastern Wheeler Ridge decreases from the west to east, suggesting that the eastern part of the examined section is uplifted and exposed to erosion at a later time than the western part of the examined section. Thereby it supports a west-to-east fold growth direction

Second, the main flowing river channels show a curvature that bends towards the east-southeast. The curvature seems to a result of gradual uplift of rocks towards the east-southeast and shows resemblance to the patterns of deflected streams during lateral fold growth. Under this assumption, this evidence supports the growth of fold towards the east-southeast.

Third, the abandonment of old river channels (formation of wind gap) can be seen in a topographic profile across ridge crest. As shown in fig.12, the base elevation of the wind gap approximately corresponds to the surface elevation of water gap 1, indicating that the original river channel along the wind gap was abandoned at the same time as water starts to flow in water gap 1 and therefore the two are probably formed from the singer river. It seems that the river originally flowing in the wind gap was deflected due to uplifting and flow along water gap 1 instead. Therefore, there is a strong evidence supporting that fold grows laterally towards east-southeast.

Forth, soil analysis indicates a high level of soil development at the western part of the examined section indicates, and the level of soil development gradually decreases towards the east. It is suggested that western part of the examined area is of an older age comparing to the eastern part, and therefore the fold grows from west to east.

== Fold linkage ==
=== Orientation of linkage ===
In an area affected by regional stress, most of the faults and folds are aligned along strike. In forced folds, linkage of folds is strongly associated with linkage of the underlying faults. Growth and displacement of faults are affected by not only the far-field stress of the region but also the position of faults relative to each other. This is a result of a reloading positive feedback mechanism, which suggests that the stress build-up in the population of faults that are aligned along strike are much faster than those located in stress shadow (i.e. transverse to the main alignments), and thus the higher frequency of rupture and growth rates in faults that are optimally aligned. Conversely, the faults that are located in stress shadow are relaxed and have a lower frequency of rupture and growth rates. As localization of deformation among faults continues, some faults may concentrate the stress and upon linking with other faults form a main fault that accommodates most of the displacement in the region. On the other hand, the faults that orient in the stress shadow will decrease in growth rates and even become inactive in the long term. As a result, in a region with pervasive compressional stress, two merged fold segments are usually aligned along-strike, as the folds would probably be rendered inactive if they are not aligned in such favorable ways.

=== Mode of linkage ===
| Linear Linkage | En-echelon Linkage | No Linkage |
|---|---|---|
| Fig. 15 Brown line: fold hinge line; Red arrow: direction of lateral fold growth. | Fig. 16 Brown line: fold hinge line; Red arrow: direction of lateral fold growth. | Fig. 17 Brown line: fold hinge line; Brown arrow: plunging direction of fold; Red arrow: direction of lateral fold growth; Amid: relative height of the horizontal middle of the area; D: perpendicular distance between hinge lines of the approaching folds. |
Resultant landforms
| A linear saddle that is aligned with the fold axis of the embryonic folds forms in between approaching folds | A curved saddle forms in between the approaching folds | Embryonic fold segments grow past each other without mechanical interaction |
Overall structure
| A continuous cylindrical fold aligning perpendicular to the regional tectonic force that resembles a Type 1 refold structure. It can be confused with a single growing embryonic fold with huge fold axial length | A single continuous cylindrical anticlinal structure with bent fold hinge around the point of linkage, resembling a Type 2 refold structure | Two oppositely plunging parallel anticlinal fold trains and a syncline form |
Remarks
| The overall structure can be easily confused with a single growing embryonic fold with huge fold axial length. Embryonic fold segments grow in a direction perpendicular to the regional tectonic force. | Growing embryonic fold segments align in a stepping manner and join obliquely. Embryonic fold segments grow in a direction perpendicular to the regional tectonic force. | Embryonic fold segments grow in a direction perpendicular to the regional tectonic force. |

== Identification of fold linkage ==
A_{mid,} relative height of surface in the horizontal middle of the surface in the area of approaching fold tips, is useful for defining the status of two approaching structures in the spectrum from no linkage to linear or en-echelon linkage. Relative height is defined as the surface elevation of the point of interest minus the average surface elevation of the area of the approaching fold tips (see fig.15).

If A_{mid}>0, linkage is present.

If A_{mid}<0, linkage is absent.

If A_{mid}~0, the structure is in the transitional zone between linkage and no-linkage.

After determining the presence of linkage between twofold segments, it is possible to identify linear linkage between the segments by a straight antiformal saddle in between the two main folds. For an en-echelon linkage, the main folds of the segments would be linked by a curved antiformal saddle in between.
