= Fold (geology) =

Stack of originally planar surfaces

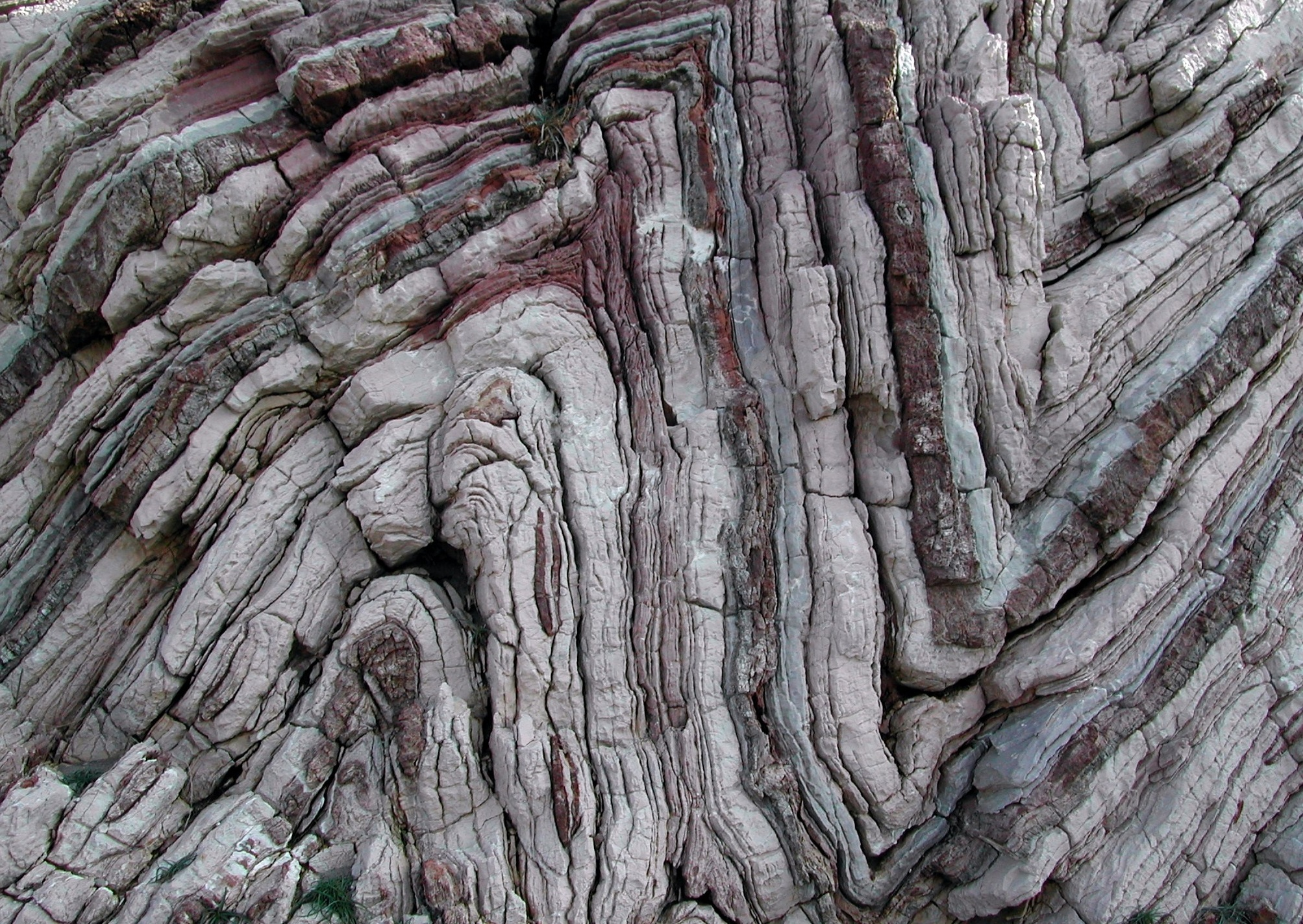
Folds of alternate layers of limestone and chert occur in Greece. The limestone and chert were originally deposited as flat layers on the floor of a deep sea basin. These folds were produced by Alpine deformation.

In structural geology, a fold is a stack of originally planar surfaces, such as sedimentary strata, that are bent or curved ("folded") during permanent deformation. Folds in rocks vary in size from microscopic crinkles to mountain-sized folds. They occur as single isolated folds or in periodic sets (known as fold trains). Synsedimentary folds are those formed during sedimentary deposition.

Folds form under varied conditions of stress, pore pressure, and temperature gradient, as evidenced by their presence in soft sediments, the full spectrum of metamorphic rocks, and even as primary flow structures in some igneous rocks. A set of folds distributed on a regional scale constitutes a fold belt, a common feature of orogenic zones. Folds are commonly formed by shortening of existing layers, but may also be formed as a result of displacement on a non-planar fault (fault bend fold), at the tip of a propagating fault (fault propagation fold), by differential compaction or due to the effects of a high-level igneous intrusion e.g. above a laccolith.

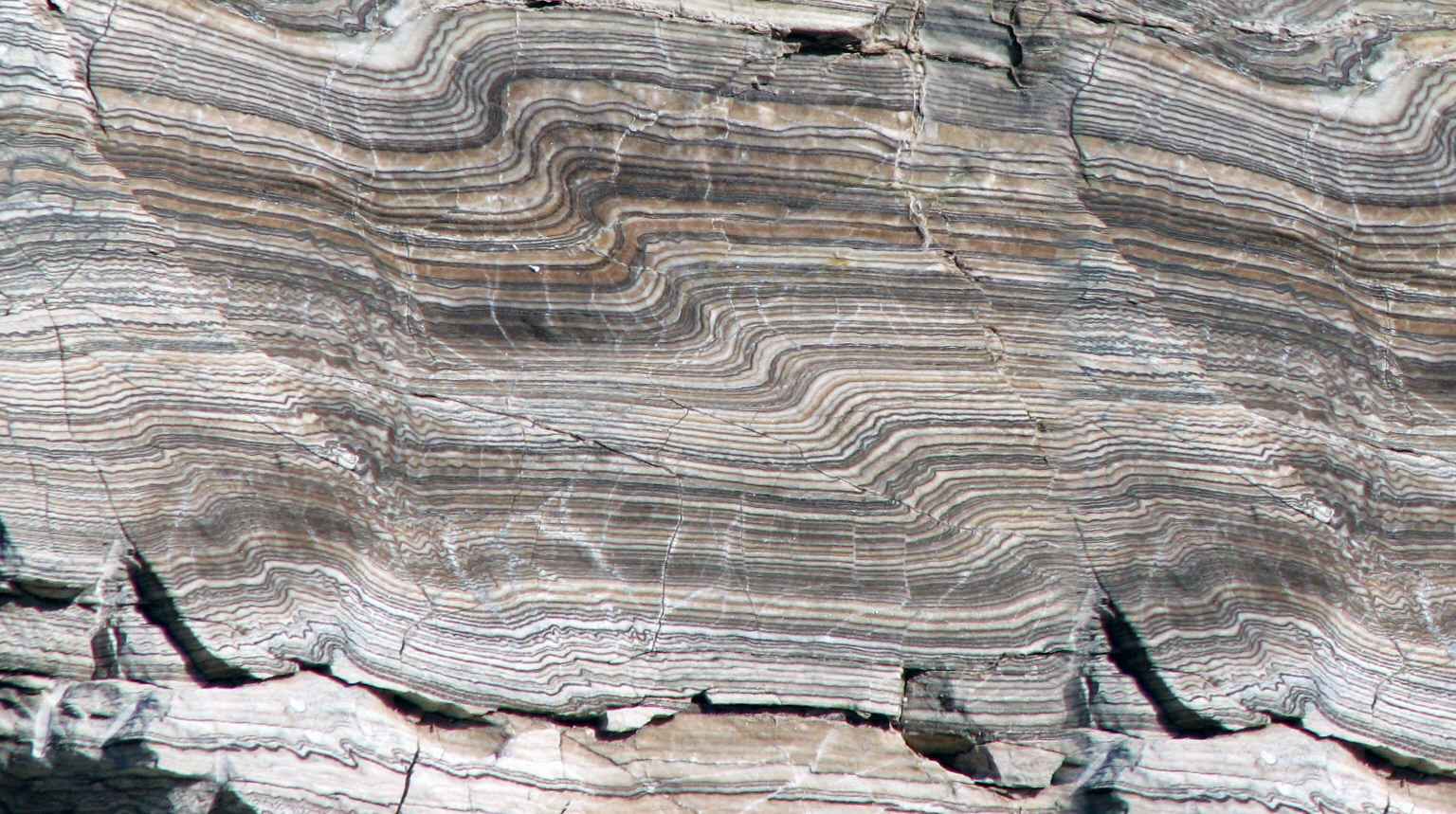
Kink band folds in the Permian of New Mexico, USA

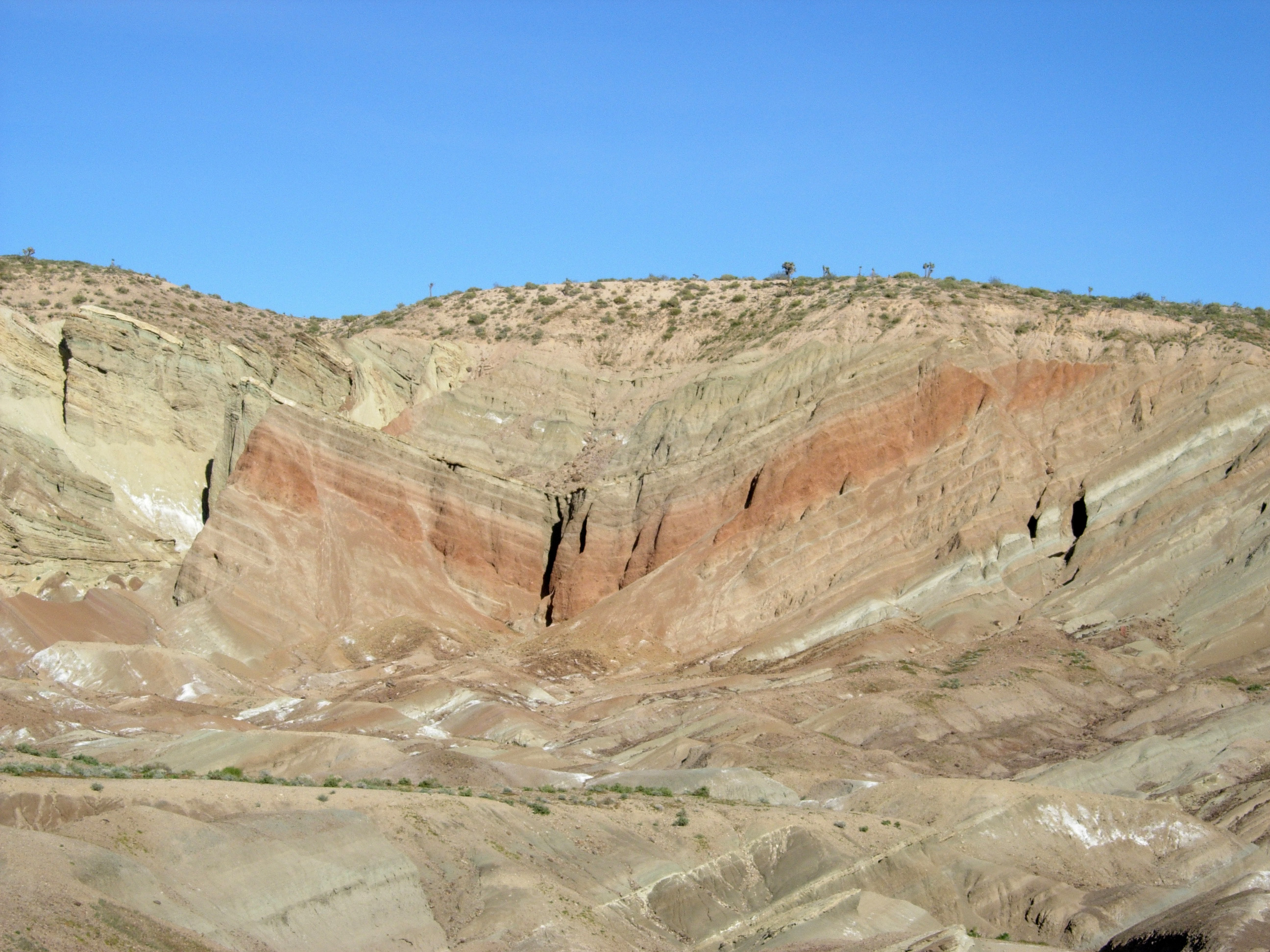
Rainbow Basin syncline in the Barstow Formation near Barstow, California

== Fold terminology ==
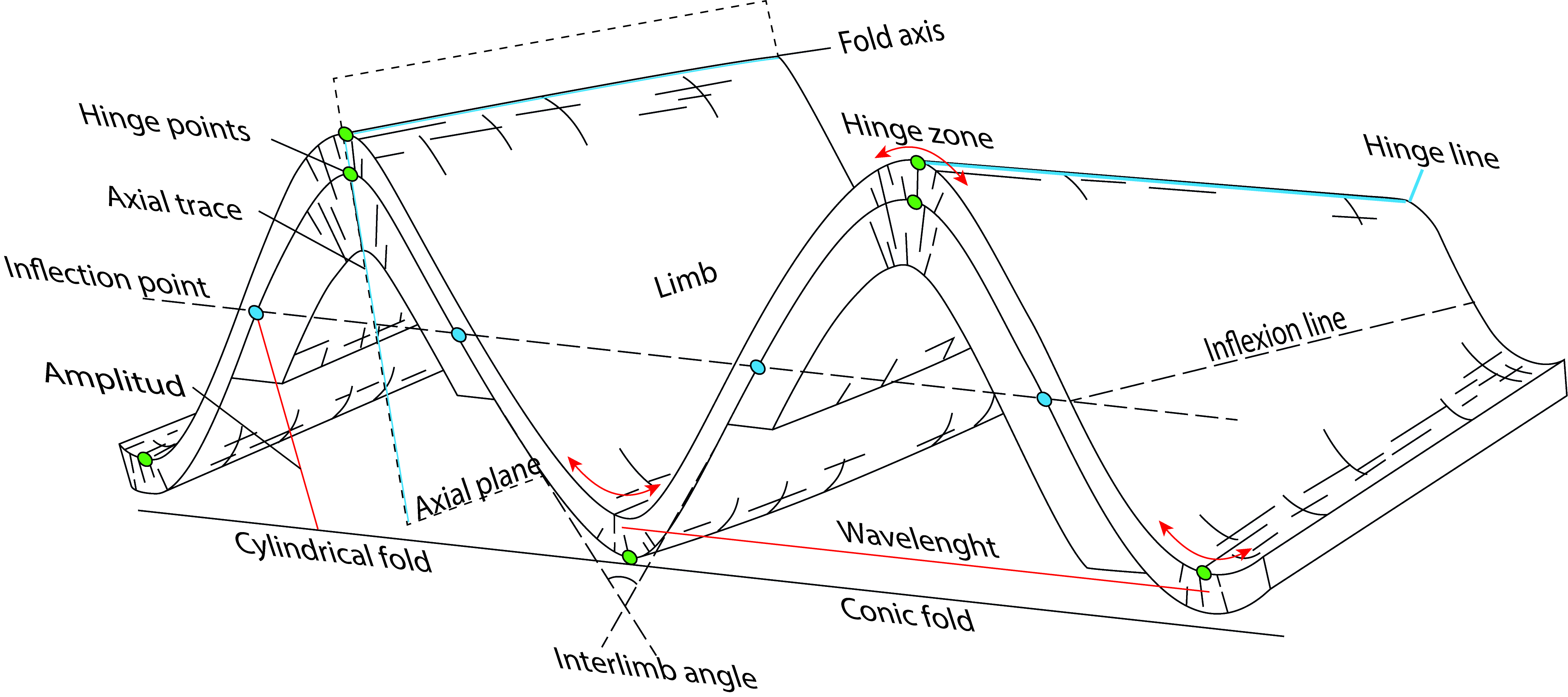
Fold sketch 3D model

The fold hinge is the line joining points of maximum curvature on a folded surface. This line may be either straight or curved. The term hinge line has also been used for this feature.

A fold surface seen perpendicular to its shortening direction can be divided into hinge and limb portions; the limbs are the flanks of the fold, and the limbs converge at the hinge zone. Within the hinge zone lies the hinge point, which is the point of minimum radius of curvature (maximum curvature) of the fold. The crest of the fold represents the highest point of the fold surface whereas the trough is the lowest point. The inflection point of a fold is the point on a limb at which the concavity reverses; on regular folds, this is the midpoint of the limb.

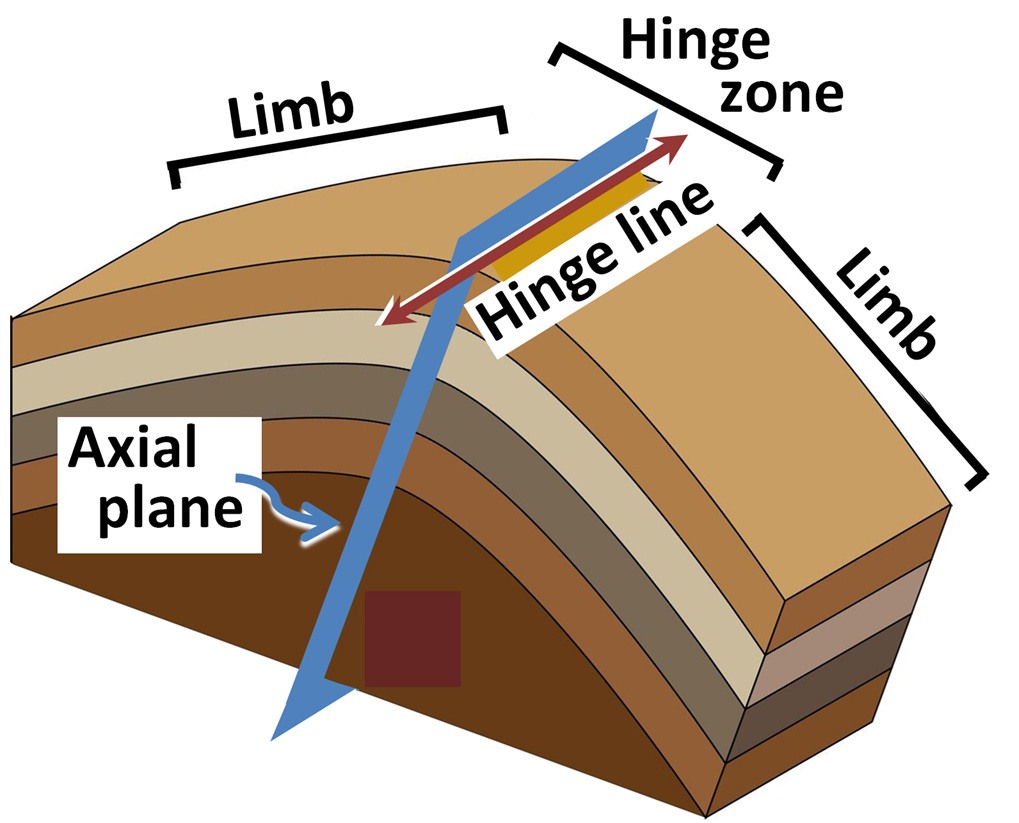
Flank & hinge

The axial surface is defined as a plane connecting all the hinge lines of stacked folded surfaces. If the axial surface is planar, it is called an axial plane and can be described in terms of strike and dip.

Folds can have a fold axis. A fold axis "is the closest approximation to a straight line that when moved parallel to itself, generates the form of the fold". (Ramsay 1967). A fold that can be generated by a fold axis is called a cylindrical fold. This term has been broadened to include near-cylindrical folds. Often, the fold axis is the same as the hinge line.

== Descriptive features ==
=== Fold size ===
Minor folds are quite frequently seen in outcrop; major folds seldom are except in the more arid countries. Minor folds can, however, often provide the key to the major folds they are related to. They reflect the same shape and style, the direction in which the closures of the major folds lie, and their cleavage indicates the attitude of the axial planes of the major folds and their direction of overturning

=== Fold shape ===
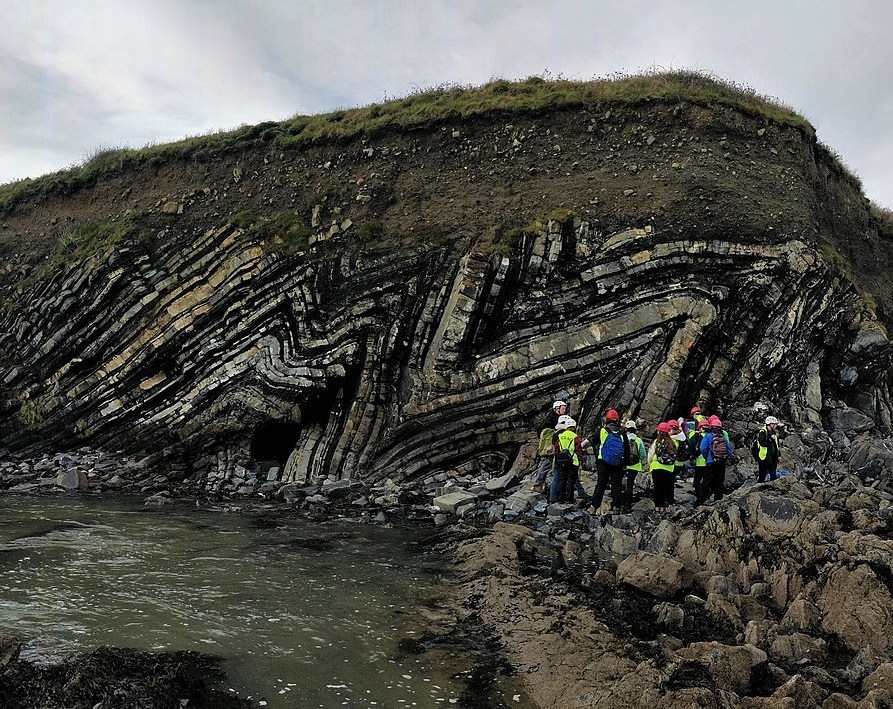
Chevron folds, Ireland

A fold can be shaped like a chevron, with planar limbs meeting at an angular axis, as cuspate with curved limbs, as circular with a curved axis, or as elliptical with unequal wavelength.

=== Fold tightness ===
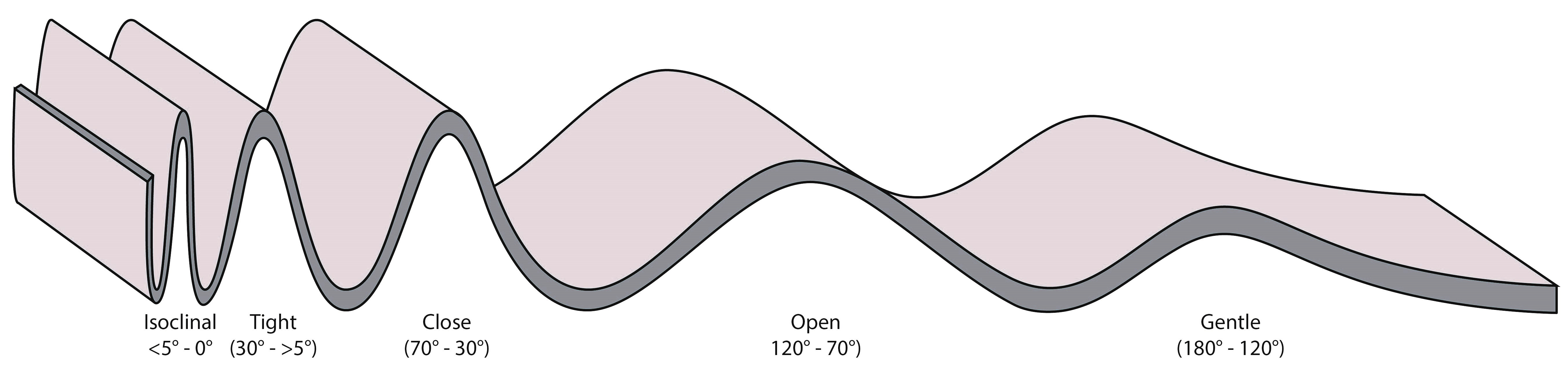
Interlimb angles

Fold tightness is defined by the size of the angle between the fold's limbs (as measured tangential to the folded surface at the inflection line of each limb), called the interlimb angle. Gentle folds have an interlimb angle of between 180° and 120°, open folds range from 120° to 70°, close folds from 70° to 30°, and tight folds from 30° to 0°. Isoclines, or isoclinal folds, have an interlimb angle of between 10° and zero, with essentially parallel limbs.

=== Fold symmetry ===
Not all folds are equal on both sides of the axis of the fold. Those with limbs of relatively equal length are termed symmetrical, and those with highly unequal limbs are asymmetrical. Asymmetrical folds generally have an axis at an angle to the original unfolded surface they formed on.

=== Facing and vergence ===
Vergence is calculated in a direction perpendicular to the fold axis.

=== Deformation style classes ===
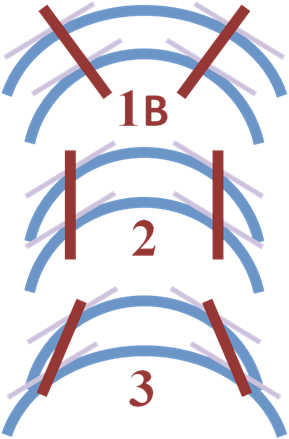
Ramsay classification of folds by convergence of dip isogons (red lines).

Folds that maintain uniform layer thickness are classed as concentric folds. Those that do not are called similar folds. Similar folds tend to display thinning of the limbs and thickening of the hinge zone. Concentric folds are caused by warping from active buckling of the layers, whereas similar folds usually form by some form of shear flow where the layers are not mechanically active. Ramsay has proposed a classification scheme for folds that often is used to describe folds in profile based upon the curvature of the inner and outer lines of a fold and the behavior of dip isogons, the lines connecting points of equal dip on adjacent folded surfaces:

Ramsay classification scheme for folds
Class	Curvature C	Comment
1	C_{inner} > C_{outer}	Dip isogons converge
1A		Orthogonal thickness at hinge narrower than at limbs
1B		Parallel folds
1C		Orthogonal thickness at limbs narrower than at hinge
2	C_{inner} = C_{outer}	Dip isogons are parallel: similar folds
3	C_{inner} < C_{outer}	Dip isogons diverge

== Types of fold ==
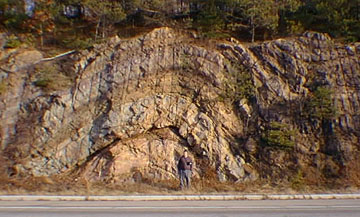
An anticline in New Jersey

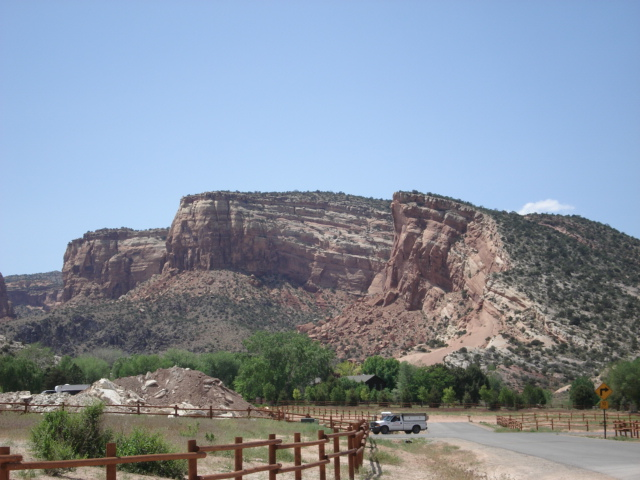
A monocline at Colorado National Monument

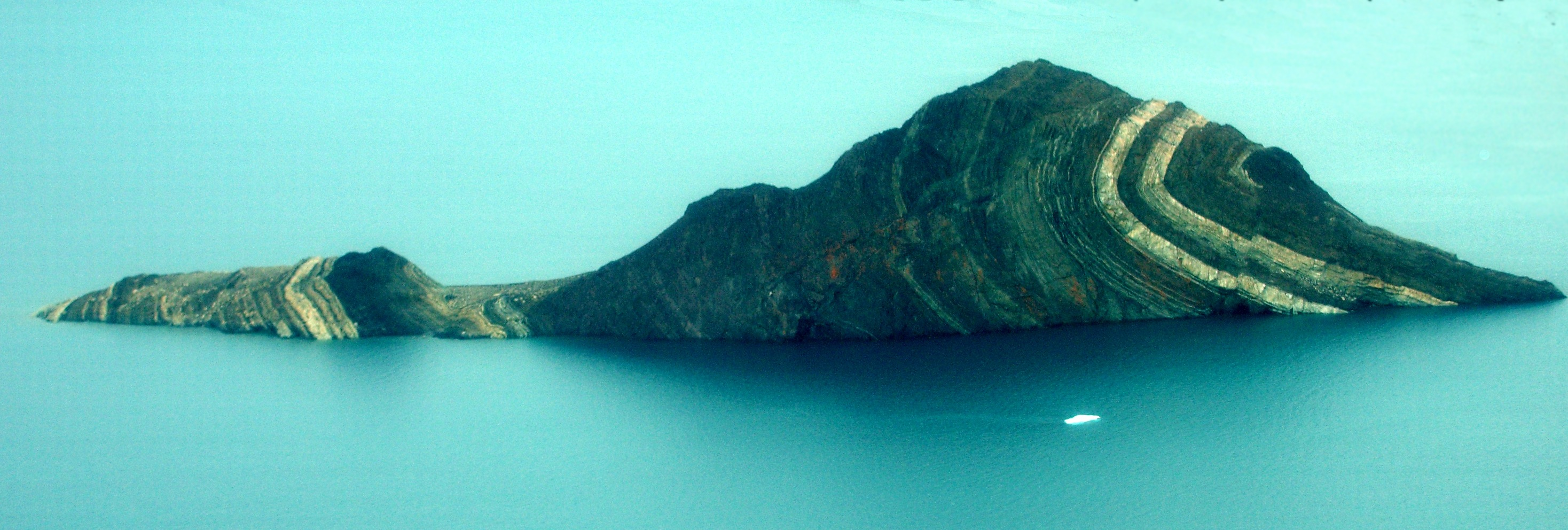
Recumbent fold, King Oscar Fjord

=== Linear ===
- Anticline: linear, strata normally dip away from the axial center, oldest strata in center irrespective of orientation.
- Syncline: linear, strata normally dip toward the axial center, youngest strata in center irrespective of orientation.
- Antiform: linear, strata dip away from the axial center, age unknown, or inverted.
- Synform: linear, strata dip toward the axial center, age unknown, or inverted.
- Monocline: linear, strata dip in one direction between horizontal layers on each side.
- Recumbent: linear, fold axial plane oriented at a low angle resulting in overturned strata in one limb of the fold.

=== Other ===
- Dome: nonlinear, strata dip away from center in all directions, oldest strata in center.
- Basin: nonlinear, strata dip toward center in all directions, youngest strata in center.
- Chevron: angular fold with straight limbs and small hinges
- Slump: typically monoclinal, the result of differential compaction or dissolution during sedimentation and lithification.
- Ptygmatic: Folds are chaotic, random and disconnected. Typical of sedimentary slump folding, migmatites and decollement detachment zones.
- Parasitic: short-wavelength folds formed within a larger wavelength fold structure - normally associated with differences in bed thickness
- Disharmonic: Folds in adjacent layers with different wavelengths and shapes

(A homocline involves strata dipping in the same direction, though not necessarily any folding.)

== Causes of folding ==
Folds appear on all scales, in all rock types, at all levels in the crust. They arise from a variety of causes.

=== Layer-parallel shortening ===
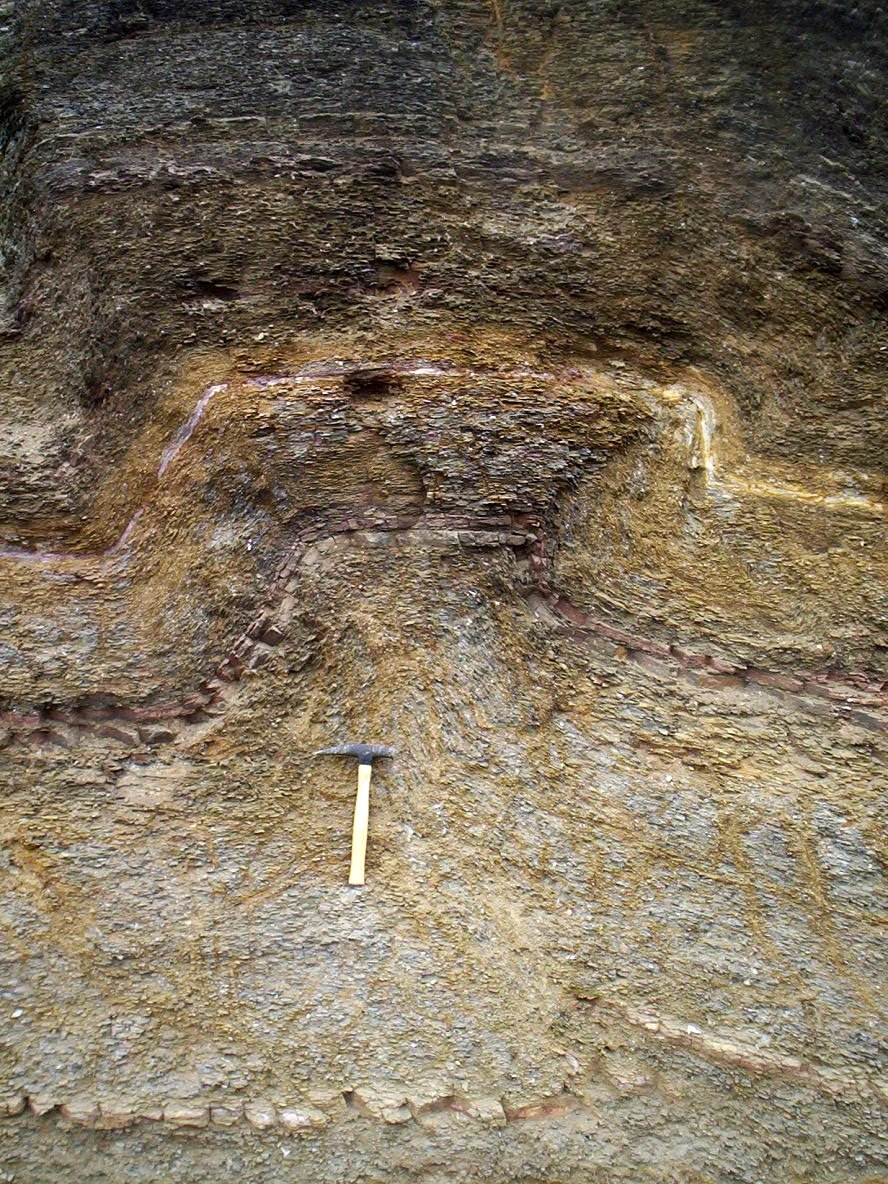
Box fold in La Herradura Formation, Morro Solar, Peru

When a sequence of layered rocks is shortened parallel to its layering, this deformation may be accommodated in a number of ways, homogeneous shortening, reverse faulting or folding. The response depends on the thickness of the mechanical layering and the contrast in properties between the layers. If the layering does begin to fold, the fold style is also dependent on these properties. Isolated thick competent layers in a less competent matrix control the folding and typically generate classic rounded buckle folds accommodated by deformation in the matrix. In the case of regular alternations of layers of contrasting properties, such as sandstone-shale sequences, kink-bands, box-folds and chevron folds are normally produced.

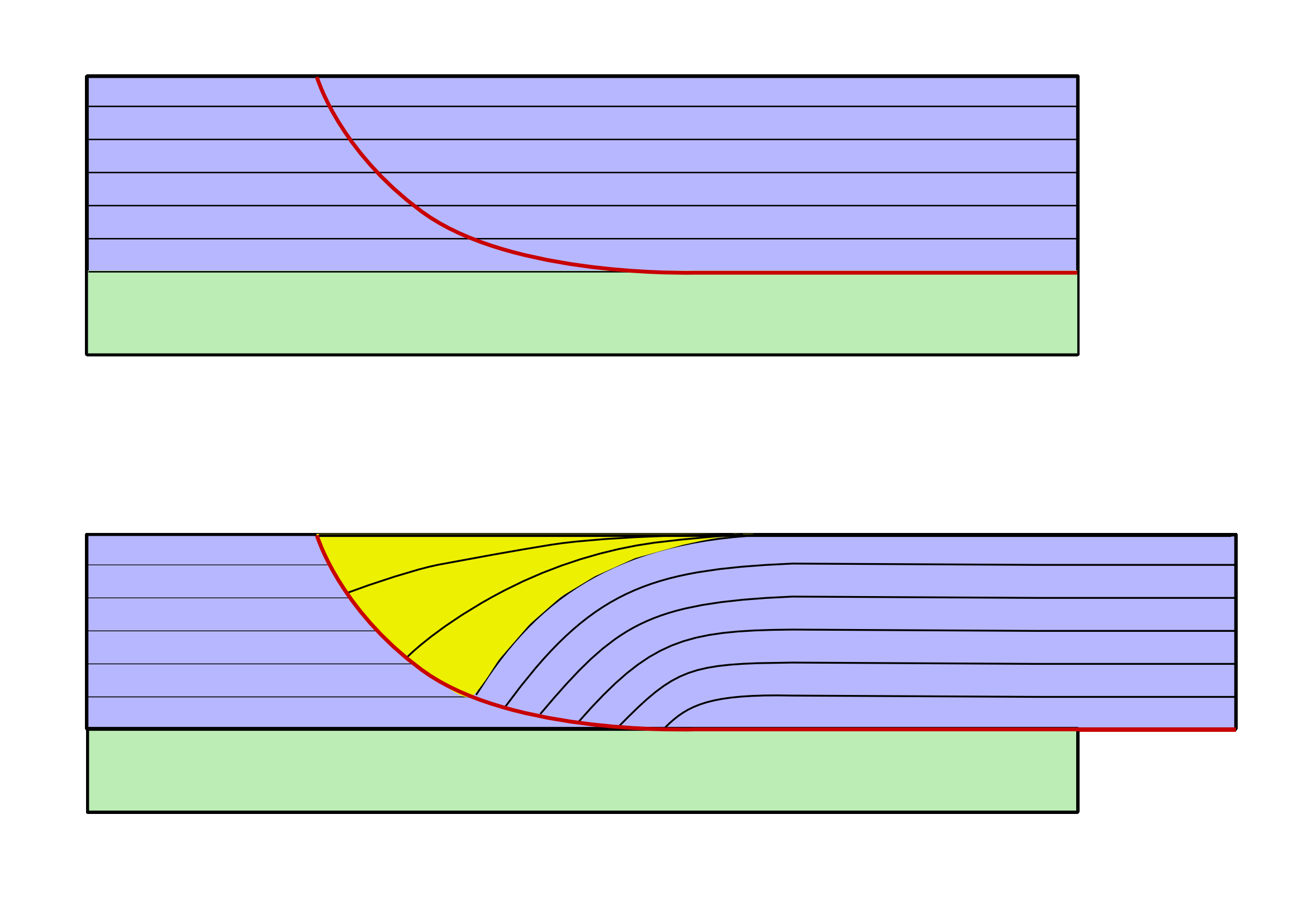
Rollover anticline

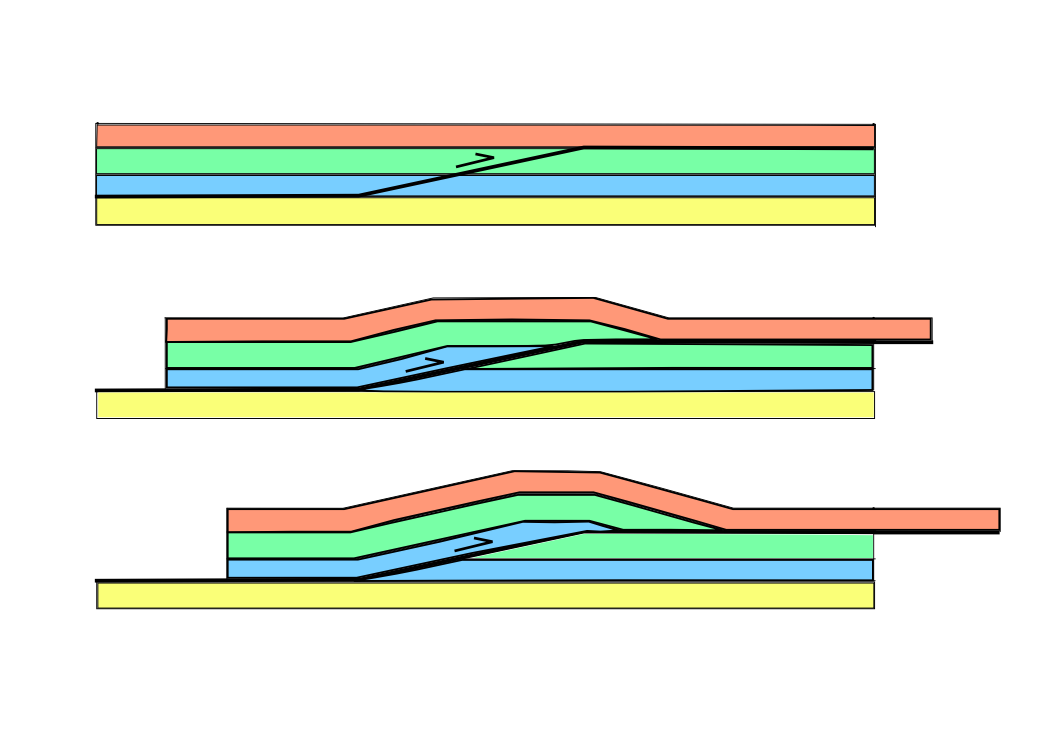
Ramp anticline

Fault-propagation fold

=== Fault-related folding ===
Many folds are directly related to faults, associated with their propagation, displacement and the accommodation of strains between neighboring faults.

==== Fault bend folding ====
Fault-bend folds are caused by displacement along a non-planar fault. In non-vertical faults, the hanging-wall deforms to accommodate the mismatch across the fault as displacement progresses. Fault bend folds occur in both extensional and thrust faulting. In extension, listric faults form rollover anticlines in their hanging walls. In thrusting, ramp anticlines form whenever a thrust fault cuts up section from one detachment level to another. Displacement over this higher-angle ramp generates the folding.

==== Fault propagation folding ====
Fault propagation folds or tip-line folds are caused when displacement occurs on an existing fault without further propagation. In both reverse and normal faults this leads to folding of the overlying sequence, often in the form of a monocline.

==== Detachment folding ====
When a thrust fault continues to displace above a planar detachment without further fault propagation, detachment folds may form, typically of box-fold style. These generally occur above a good detachment such as in the Jura Mountains, where the detachment occurs on middle Triassic evaporites.

=== Folding in shear zones ===
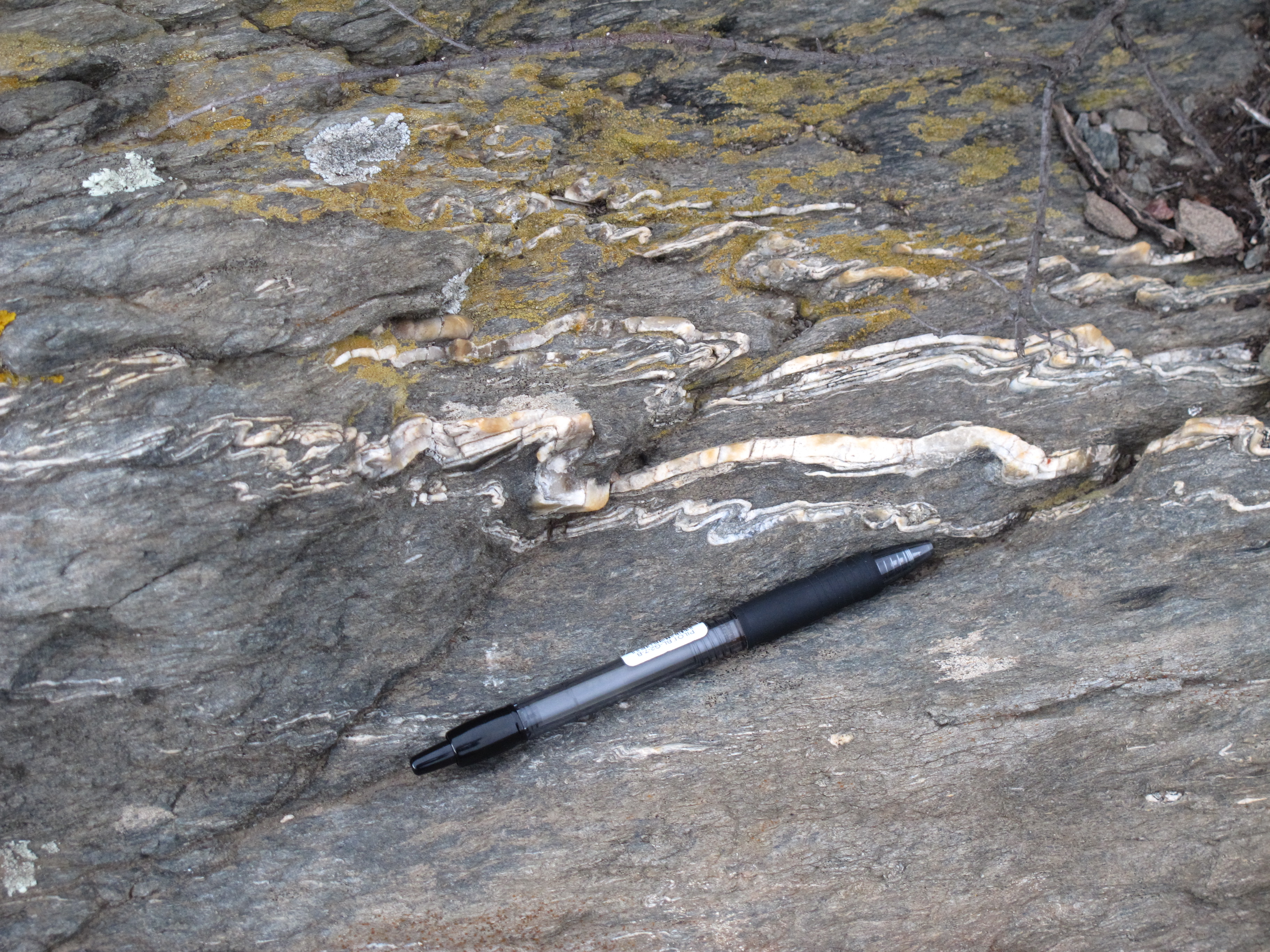
Dextral sense shear folds in mylonites within a shear zone, Cap de Creus

Shear zones that approximate to simple shear typically contain minor asymmetric folds, with the direction of overturning consistent with the overall shear sense. Some of these folds have highly curved hinge-lines and are referred to as sheath folds. Folds in shear zones can be inherited, formed due to the orientation of pre-shearing layering or formed due to instability within the shear flow.

=== Folding in sediments ===
Recently deposited sediments are normally mechanically weak and prone to remobilization before they become lithified, leading to folding. To distinguish them from folds of tectonic origin, such structures are called synsedimentary (formed during sedimentation).

Slump folding: When slumps form in poorly consolidated sediments, they commonly undergo folding, particularly at their leading edges, during their emplacement. The asymmetry of the slump folds can be used to determine paleoslope directions in sequences of sedimentary rocks.

Dewatering: Rapid dewatering of sandy sediments, possibly triggered by seismic activity, can cause convolute bedding.

Compaction: Folds can be generated in a younger sequence by differential compaction over older structures such as fault blocks and reefs.

=== Igneous intrusion ===
The emplacement of igneous intrusions tends to deform the surrounding country rock. In the case of high-level intrusions, near the Earth's surface, this deformation is concentrated above the intrusion and often takes the form of folding, as with the upper surface of a laccolith.

=== Flow folding ===
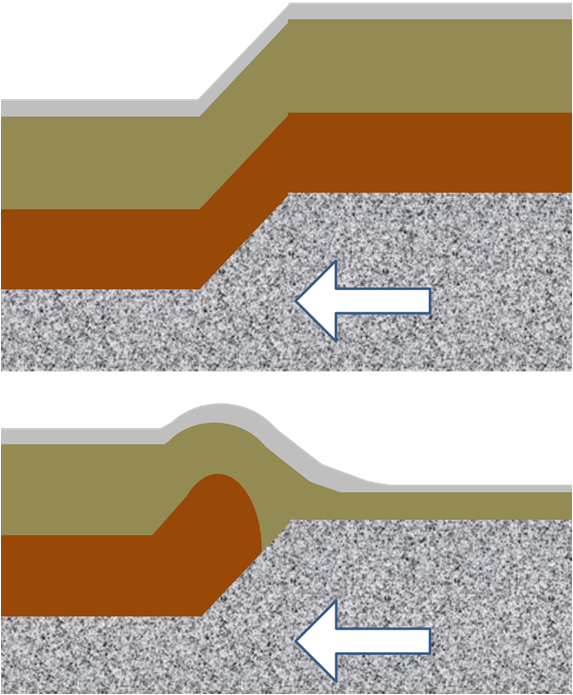
Flow folding: depiction of the effect of an advancing ramp of rigid rock into compliant layers. Top: low drag by a ramp: layers are not altered in thickness; Bottom: high drag: lowest layers tend to crumple.

The compliance of rock layers is referred to as competence: a competent layer or bed of rock can withstand an applied load without collapsing and is relatively strong, while an incompetent layer is relatively weak. When rock behaves as a fluid, as in the case of very weak rock such as rock salt, or any rock that is buried deeply enough, it typically shows flow folding (also called passive folding, because little resistance is offered): the strata appear shifted undistorted, assuming any shape impressed upon them by surrounding more rigid rocks. The strata simply serve as markers of the folding. Such folding is also a feature of many igneous intrusions and glacier ice.

== Folding mechanisms ==
Folding of rocks must balance the deformation of layers with the conservation of volume in a rock mass. This occurs by several mechanisms.

=== Flexural slip ===
Flexural slip allows folding by creating layer-parallel slip between the layers of the folded strata, which, altogether, result in deformation. A good analogy is bending a phone book, where volume preservation is accommodated by slip between the pages of the book.

The fold formed by the compression of competent rock beds is called "flexure fold".

=== Buckling ===
Typically, folding is thought to occur by simple buckling of a planar surface and its confining volume. The volume change is accommodated by layer parallel shortening the volume, which grows in thickness. Folding under this mechanism is typical of a similar fold style, as thinned limbs are shortened horizontally and thickened hinges do so vertically.

=== Mass displacement ===
If the folding deformation cannot be accommodated by a flexural slip or volume-change shortening (buckling), the rocks are generally removed from the path of the stress. This is achieved by pressure dissolution, a form of metamorphic process, in which rocks shorten by dissolving constituents in areas of high strain and redepositing them in areas of lower strain. Folds generated in this way include examples in migmatites and areas with a strong axial planar cleavage.

== Mechanics of folding ==
Folds in the rock are formed about the stress field in which the rocks are located and the rheology, or method of response to stress, of the rock at the time at which the stress is applied.

The rheology of the layers being folded determines characteristic features of the folds that are measured in the field. Rocks that deform more easily form many short-wavelength, high-amplitude folds. Rocks that do not deform as easily form long-wavelength, low-amplitude folds.

== Economic implications ==
=== Mining industry ===
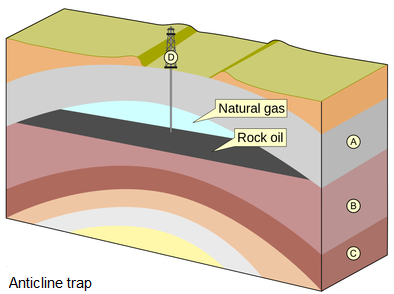
anticline oil trap

Layers of rock that fold into a hinge need to accommodate large deformations in the hinge zone. This results in voids between the layers. These voids, and especially the fact that the water pressure is lower in the voids than outside of them, act as triggers for the deposition of minerals. Over millions of years, this process is capable of gathering large quantities of trace minerals from large expanses of rock and depositing them at very concentrated sites. This may be a mechanism that is responsible for the veins. To summarize, when searching for veins of valuable minerals, it might be wise to look for highly folded rock, and this is the reason why the mining industry is very interested in the theory of geological folding.

=== Oil industry ===
Anticlinal traps are formed by folding of rock. For example, if a porous sandstone unit covered with low permeability shale is folded into an anticline, it may form a hydrocarbons trap, oil accumulating in the crest of the fold. Most anticlinal traps are produced as a result of sideways pressure, folding the layers of rock, but can also occur from sediments being compacted.

== See also ==
- 3D fold evolution
- Orogeny
- Mountain building
- Rock mechanics
- Thrust fault
