= Synclinal =

Synclinal may refer to:

- Syncline, in structural geology, a syncline is a fold, with younger layers closer to the center of the structure.
- Synclinal, in alkane stereochemistry, a torsion angle between 30° to 90° and –30° to –90°

== See also ==
- Homocline
- Newman projection
- Detachment fold
- Gauche effect
