= Cross section (geology) =

Diagram showing underground structure of rocks

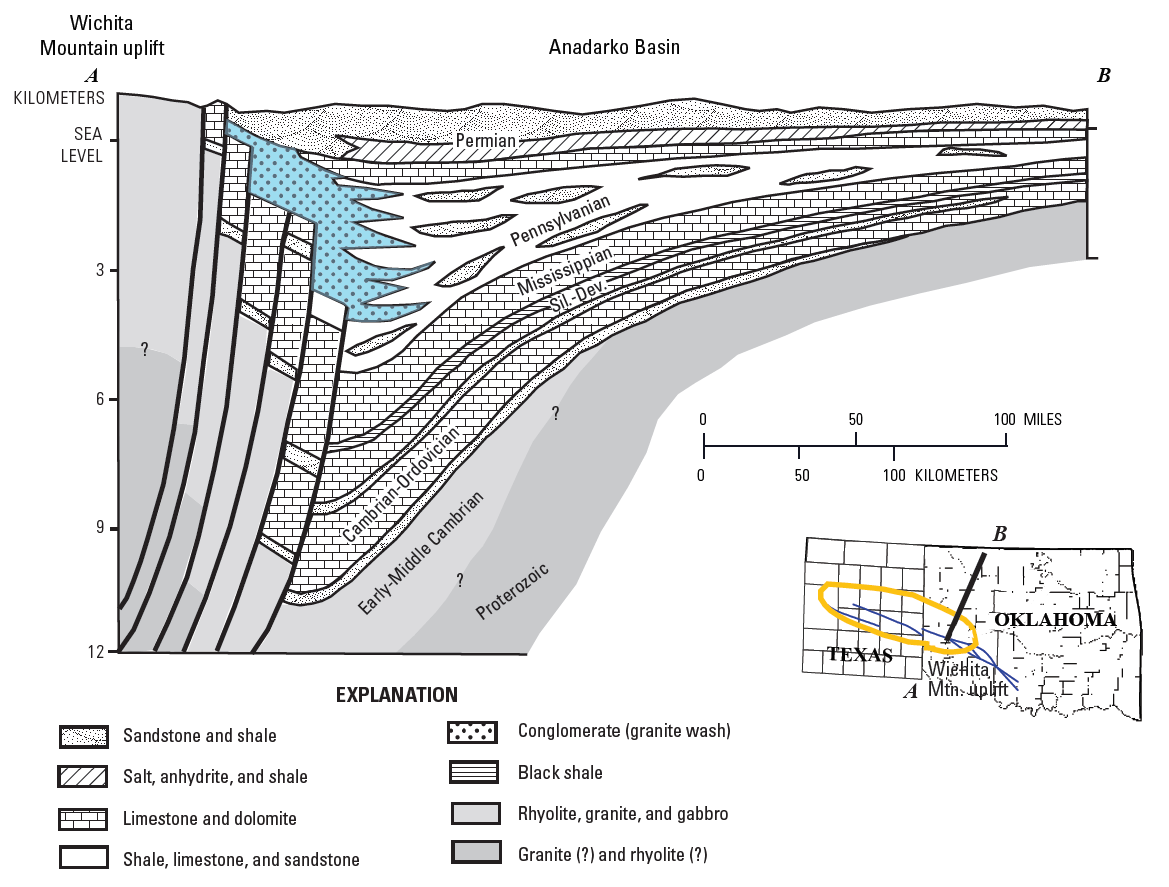
A cross section of the Anadarko Basin. The letters A and B at the top correspond to the line labeled A--B on the smaller map. In this example, the vertical scale is exaggerated compared to the horizontal scale.

In geology, a cross section, also known as a geologic(al) section, is a diagram representing the geologic features intersecting a vertical plane.

== Description ==
A cross section is drawn as a vertical map, as if the ground had been cut open and exposed along a given line. Various lines, colours, patterns, and symbols are used to represent different rock sections and features. Because the length of the studied area is often much greater than the depth, the diagram's scale can be vertically exaggerated to emphasise the depth or height of features and make them more visible. The plane a cross section illustrates is typically labelled as a line on a map of the surrounding region.

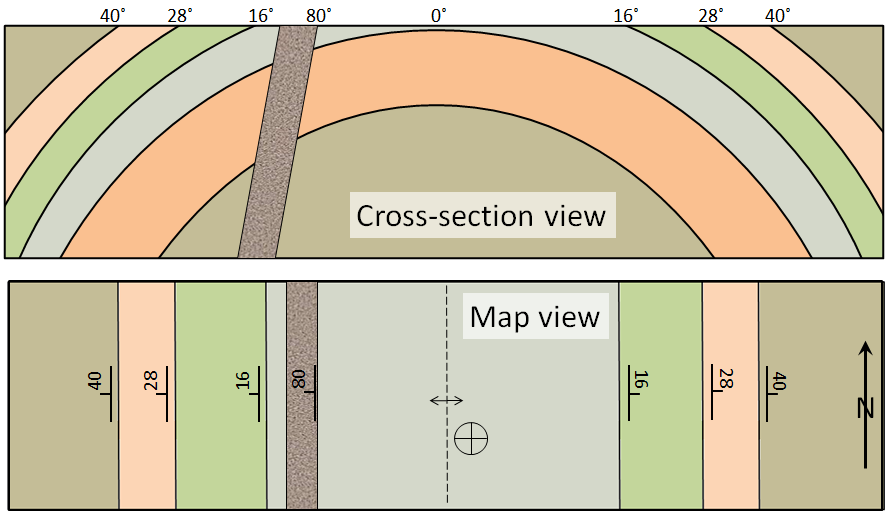
An example cross section of an anticline with a dike cutting through, with the map of its surface expression showing strike and dip information

Cross sections are made by interpreting and extrapolating a broad range of information about a region's geological characteristics. This can include data from the surface, subsurface, and existing geological maps. Analyzed data can include rock samples, structure orientation, boreholes, relationships between structures, seismic surveys, etc. Because much of the extrapolated information cannot be directly observed, there is an inherent amount of uncertainty about the accuracy of the final product.

== Terminology ==
The diagram is variously known as a cross section, geologic(al) section, or simply section.

== Uses ==
It is used to illustrate an area's structure and stratigraphy that would otherwise be hidden underground. The features described in a cross section can include rock units, faults, topography, and more. They often accompany geological maps, complementing the overhead view with a side-on view, which can help to visualize the three-dimensional structure of the region and clarify the relationships between features.

== See also ==
- Cross section (geometry)
- Section restoration
