= Section restoration =

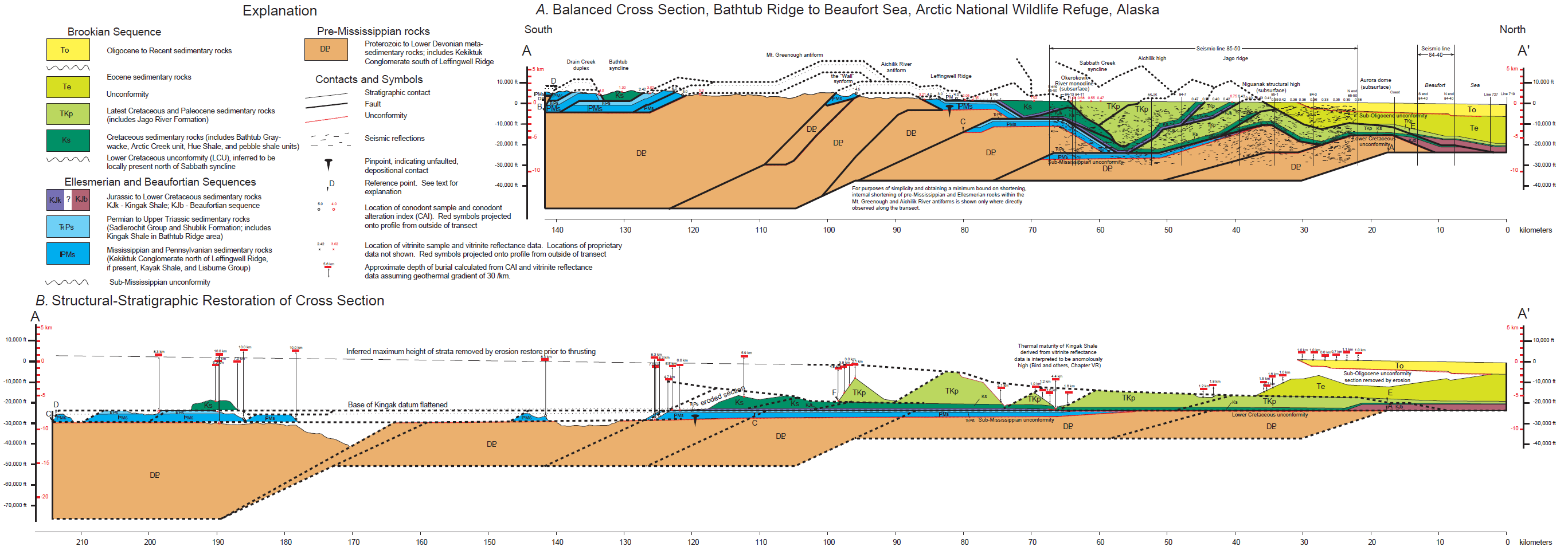
Example of restored and balanced section from National Wildlife Refuge 1002 Area, Alaska

In structural geology section restoration or palinspastic restoration is a technique used to progressively undeform a geological section in an attempt to validate the interpretation used to build the section. It is also used to provide insights into the geometry of earlier stages of the geological development of an area. A section that can be successfully undeformed to a geologically reasonable geometry, without change in area, is known as a balanced section.

Comparably a palinspastic map is a map view of geological features, often also including present-day coastlines to aid the reader in recognising the area, representing the state before deformation.

== 2D restoration ==
=== Development of technique ===
The earliest attempts to produce restored sections were on foreland fold and thrust belts. This technique assumed a stratigraphic template with unit thicknesses either constant or smoothly varying across the section. Line lengths were measured on the present-day deformed section and transferred to the template, to rebuild the section as it was before deformation started. This method does not guarantee that area is conserved, only line length. The technique was applied to areas of extensional tectonics initially using vertical simple shear. Over the next decade several types of commercial restoration software became available, allowing the technique to be routinely applied.

=== Deformation algorithms ===
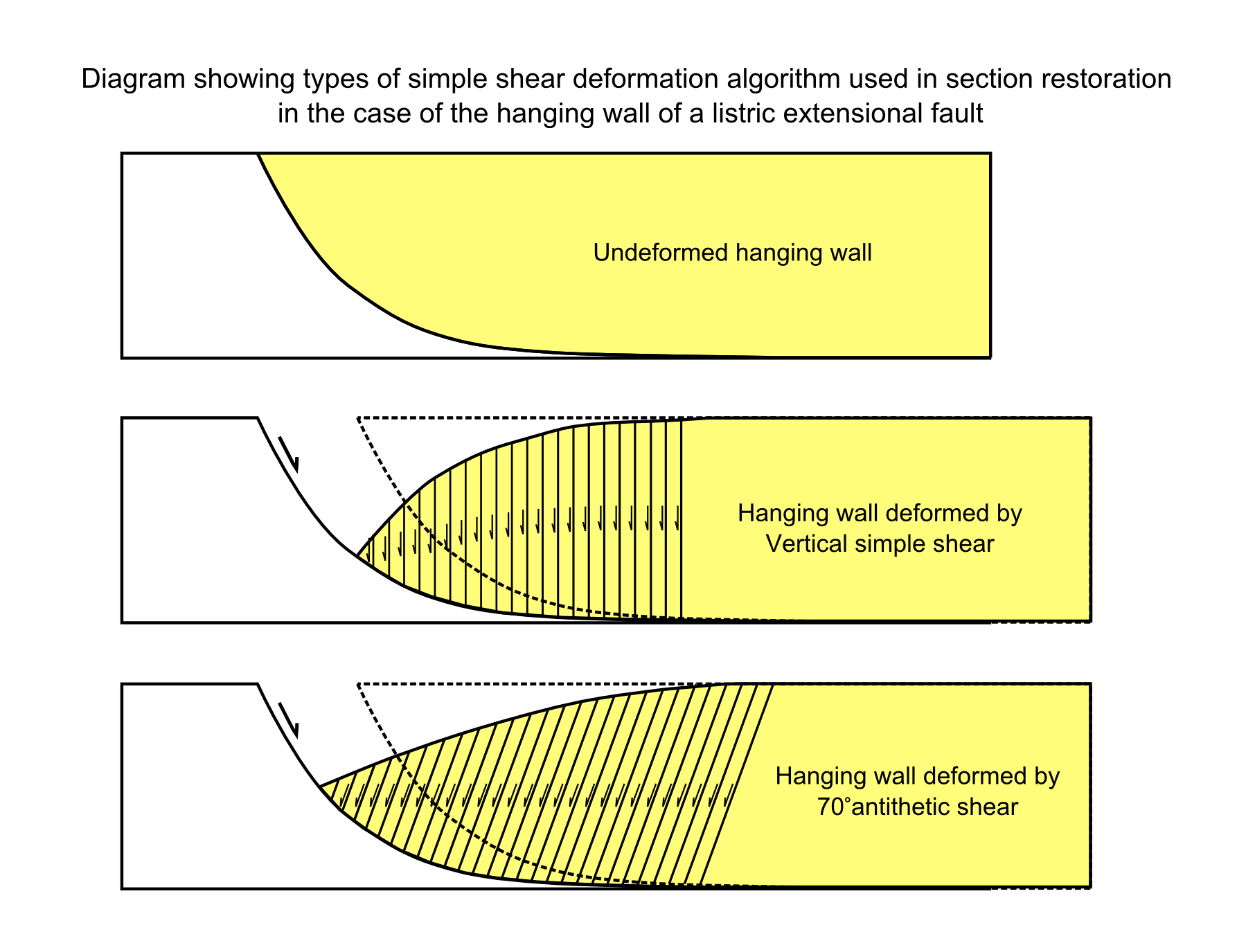

In order to calculate the change in shape of an element within the section, various deformation algorithms are used. Initially many of these were applied manually, but are now available in specialist software packages. It is worth mentioning that these deformation algorithms are approximations and idealizations of actual strain paths and deviate from reality (Ramsey and Huber, 1987). Geologic media are typically not continuum materials; that is, they are not isotropic media as is implicitly assumed in all strain algorithms used for cross-section balancing. That said, balanced cross sections maintain material balance, which is important for conceptualizing kinematic histories of deformed regions.

==== Vertical/inclined shear ====
This mechanism deforms an element to accommodate a change in shape by movement on closely spaced parallel planes of slip. The commonest assumption is vertical shear although comparisons with well understood examples suggest that antithetic inclined shear (i.e. in the opposite sense of dip to the controlling fault) at about 60°–70° is the best approximation to the behaviour of real rocks under extension. These algorithms preserve area but do not, in general, preserve line length. Restoration using this type of algorithm can be carried out by hand, but is normally done using specialist software. This algorithm is not generally thought to represent the actual mechanism by which deformation occurs, just to represent a reasonable approximation.

==== Flexural slip ====
In a flexural slip algorithm deformation occurs by unfolding the deformed fault bounded horse by slip along bedding planes. This modelling mechanism does represent a real geological mechanism, as shown by slickensides along folded bedding planes. The shape of the unfolded horse is further constrained either by using the restored fault boundary to the previous horse in the restored section of by using an internal pin within the block itself, assuming this was unsheared during the deformation. This algorithm is normally only used in software based restoration. It preserves both area and line length.

==== Trishear ====
A trishear algorithm is used to model and restore fault-propagation folds as other algorithms fail to explain thickness changes and strain variations associated with such folds. The deformation within the tip-zone of the propagating fault is idealised to heterogeneous shear within a triangular zone starting at the fault tip.

=== Compaction ===
In most section restorations there is an element of backstripping and decompaction. This is necessary to adjust the geometry of the section for the compactional effects of later sediment loading.

== Forward modelling ==
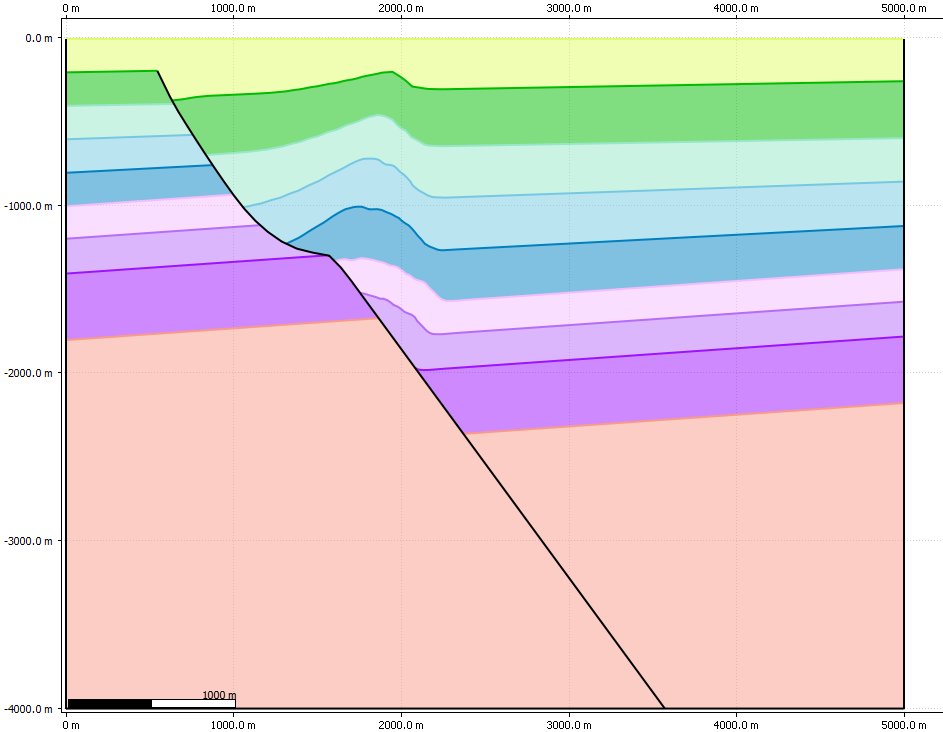
forward model of extensional fault bend folding

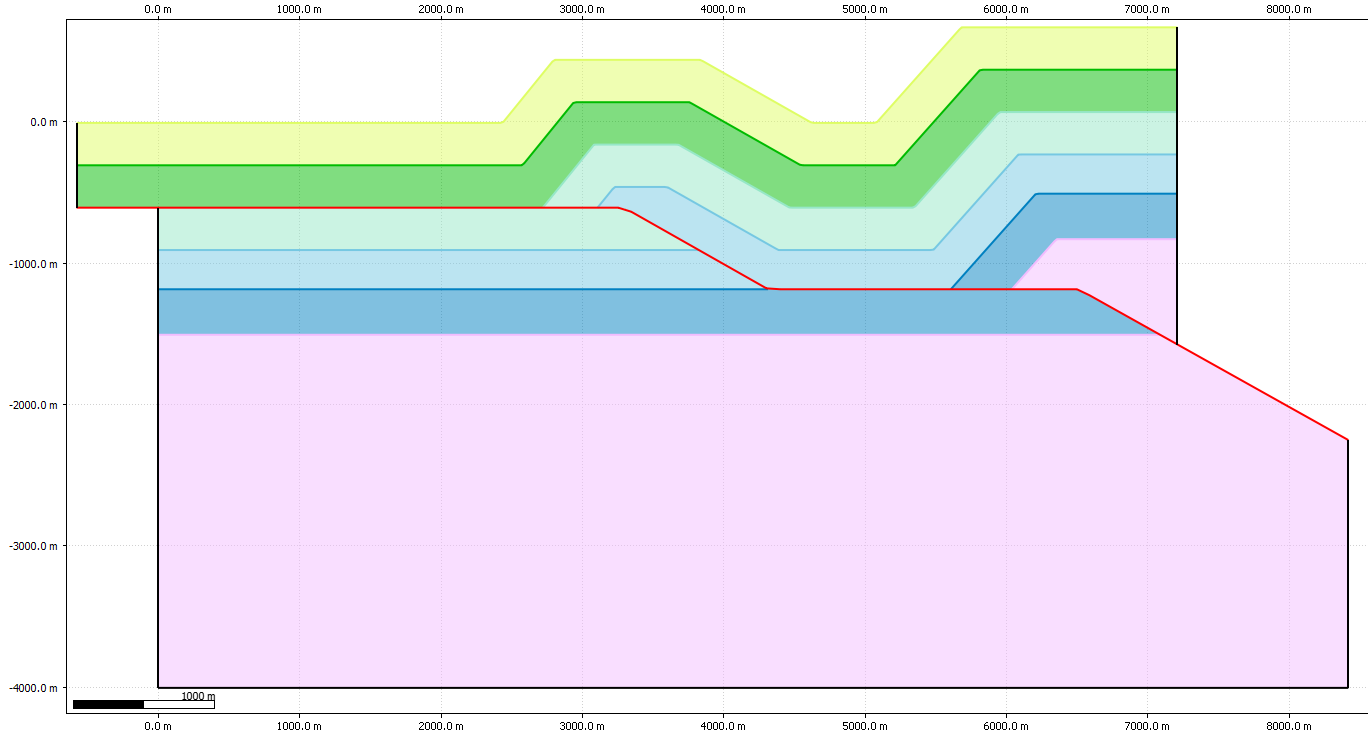
forward model of thrust fault bend folding

Section restoration involves undeforming a natural example, a form of inverse modelling. In many cases carrying out forward modelling helps to test out concepts for all or part of the section.

== 3D restoration ==
A basic assumption of 2D restoration is that the displacement on all faults is within the plane of the section. It also assumes that no material enters or leaves the section plane. In areas of complex multi-phase or strike slip deformation or where salt is present, this is rarely the case. 3D restoration can only be carried out using specialist software, such as Midland Valley's Move3D, Paradigm's Kine3D or Schlumberger's Dynel3D. The results of such restoration can be used to study the migration of hydrocarbons at an earlier stage.
