= Detachment fold =

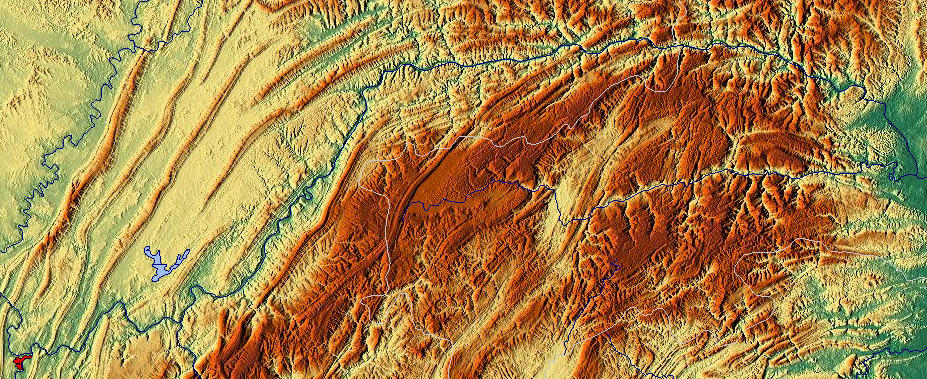
Topographic map showing detachment folds in the eastern Sichuan Basin, China.

A detachment fold, in geology, occurs as layer parallel thrusting along a decollement (or detachment) develops without upward propagation of a fault; the accommodation of the strain produced by continued displacement along the underlying thrust results in the folding of the overlying rock units. As a visual aid, picture a rug on the floor. By placing a foot on one end and pushing that foot towards the other end of the rug, the rug slides across the floor (decollement) and folds upward (detachment fold). Figure 1 is a generalized representation of the geometry assumed by a detachment fault.

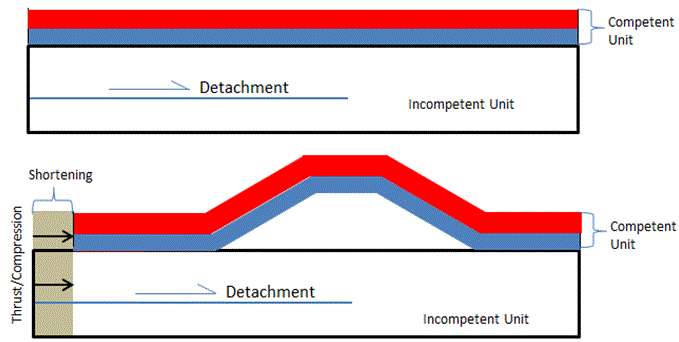
Figure 1. The general geometry of a detachment fold illustrating the shortening above a layer parallel decollement and the resulting geometry of a detachment fold in a compressional environment.

== Definitions ==
Detachment folding occurs as strain imposed on a mechanically weak layer or incompetent unit, such as shale or salt, or at the boundary between an incompetent and more competent unit, induces resistance from the units resulting in folding typically observed in the competent unit. Once the resistance of these units is overcome with strain, or the variation in strain between the units becomes great enough, a shearing motion known as a detachment fault may occur. A detachment fault may be located within an incompetent unit or at the boundary of an incompetent and a competent unit, which accommodates for strain differences between the units and allows displacement to occur in a planar field. Detachment folding occurs in regions of thick-skinned deformation, where the basement is involved in deformation and thin-skinned deformation, where deformation occurs at relatively shallow depth in the crust.

== Modes of detachment folding ==
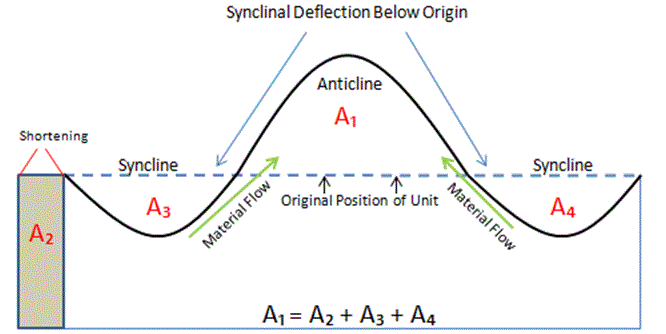
Figure 2. A model of the law of conservation of volume by synclinal deflection; that is, the area (given by A then a subscript) of the anticline should be equal to the area of shortening plus the synclinal deflection A_{1} = A_{2}+A_{3}+A_{4}. Synclinal deflection below the origin (dotted line) is shown marked by the A_{3} and A_{4}.

J. Contreras (2010) developed a model for low-amplitude detachments using the conservation of mass equation. The results suggest the occurrence of layer thickening as an initial response to shortening and volume conservation. Hayes and Hanks (2008) confirm layer thickening during the onset of folding; specifically, their field data places the thickening at the hinges of folds rather than the limbs. When defining the geometry of detachment folding it may be necessary to define layer thickening as it has been recorded to affect the overall geometry. Though variable limb thickness is assumed; over time, limb rotation and limb length become the dominant mechanisms for deformation, leading to an increase in fold amplitude.

Synclinal deflection, Figure 2, is the result of folding where synclines, adjacent to an anticline in fold geometry, extend into the lower incompetent unit; these typically occur in regions of high wavelength and low amplitude. The occupancy of this area causes displacement above the detachment in the form of material migration to the anticlinal core. Withdrawal from the regional position is dependent on thickness and viscosity differences between the competent and incompetent units as well as the ductile nature of the incompetent unit.

== Detachment fold evolution ==
Though many models have been developed to help explain the kinematic evolution of single layer detachment faulting, many models do not account for multiple layers, complex fold geometries, or differential strain through fold geometries or mechanically dissimilar stratigraphic units. These models may not be good indicators of detachment folding on a large scale and are better suited to assist in interpreting fold geometries of detachment folds as their kinematic evolution is generally associated with single-fold, single-unit deformations. The definition of disharmonic folds (below), however, incorporates many types of symmetric folds over a larger area encompassing many geometries and attributes of the basic models and may be better suited to the application of these models.

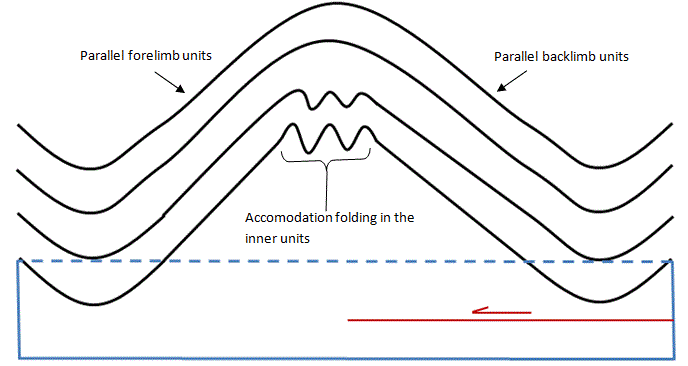
Figure 3. Disharmonic folding of a detachment fold using a symmetric geometric fold as a model. As compression develops, space issues arise in the anticlinal core. To accommodate these space issues folding becomes tighter within the inner units, creating a disharmonic fold geometry.

By incorporating elementary fold geometries under the term disharmonic, fold detachment folds may then be classified into one of two categories: disharmonic folds or lift-off folds. Disharmonic folds, Figure 3, are defined as detachment folds characterized by parallel geometries at the outer limbs and non-parallel interlimb geometries at stratigraphically distinct and lower units, caused by differential strain as a result of strain dissipation or change in mechanical stratigraphy, where the termination of folding typically results in a detachment. Lift-off detachment folds are characterized by isoclinal folding in all units, with a tight isoclinal folded weak unit in the anticline and parallel geometries sometimes existing along the outer units. Present day examples detachment folding can be found in the Jura Mountains of Central Europe. This region complements the idea of detachment fold evolution put forth by Mitra in that it encompasses many of the basic fold geometries and comprises both disharmonic and lift-off geometries.

Disharmonic and lift-off detachment folds are commonly assumed to form by separate modes of deformation; however, Mitra (2003) in a unified kinematic model challenged these ideas by suggesting an evolution of detachment folding wherein progressive deformation yields a fold transition from disharmonic geometry to lift-off detachment folding. While most kinematic models are developed to yield the most simplistic geometries by placing boundary conditions within the model and limiting variables, the unified model incorporates mechanical stratigraphy parameter limb lengthening, limb rotation, area balancing, and anticlinal and synclinal deflection, to develop a system that uniformly demonstrates the evolution of detachment folding.

The evolution of detachment folding begins with the model assumption of a low-amplitude and short compressional environment with a mechanically dissimilar incompetent and competent unit. Folding initiates by shortening; limb lengthening and rotation and hinge migration cause synclinal deflection below its original position accompanied by the flow of ductile material beneath the synclinal trough to the anticlinal core, resulting in increased amplitude of the anticlinal fold.

Further compression dominated by hinge migration yields tightening of folds and space-accommodation issues within the anticlinal core, leading to the formation of disharmonic folds. Epard and Groshong (1994) recognize a similar pattern to disharmonic folding; they label it second-order shortening. Basic models and experiments as well as concentric fold models fail to recognize disharmonic folds as they focus on single-layer detachment folding, lack the resolution in experimental methods, or, though the assumption of multiple units is made, restrict unit parameters which may cause disharmony through deformation. Continued shortening and excess material within the anticlinal core not only results in increased amplitude and disharmonic folds, but may lead to the onset of thrusts out of the folded synclinal or anticlinal regions. Through further deformation by limb rotation and through hinge migration, isoclinal folds eventually assume lift-off geometries. Thrust faults in the synclinal fold, if any formed, may also be rotated to assist in the formation of detached lift-off folds upon further tightening and rotation (Figure 4).

== Detachment faulting ==
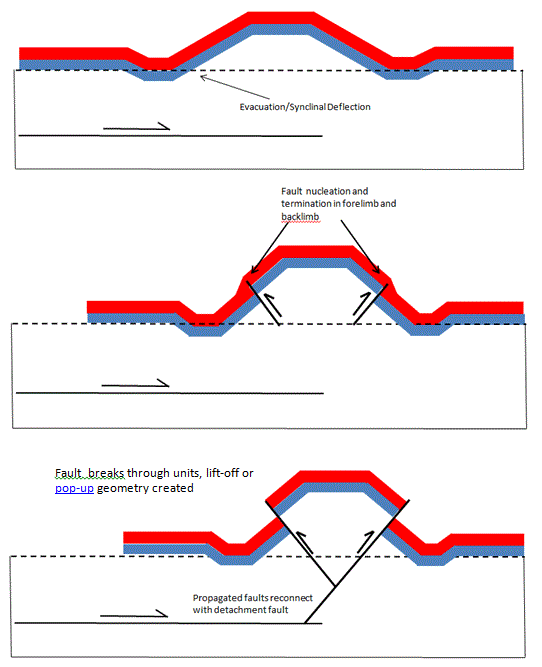
Figure 4. Schematic depicting faulting of a symmetric detachment fold. The result of continued limb rotation and compression is the formation of faults in the forelimb and backlimb of the fold. Eventually these faults reconnect with the detachment and a pop-up may occur.

It is documented in many cases that faulting may develop from detachment folding or through the kinematic mechanisms involved with folding. In general, faulting may occur during fault slip and detachment folding in two ways. Firstly, faulting may be induced when progressive folding or tightening of a folded limb reaches its maximum fold geometry resulting in a transition from folding to shearing. Secondly, it has been suggested a fault may propagate into the anticlinal core if material flow and accommodation space are not at equilibrium. The idea of insufficient material flow may not be as well-addressed as faulting due to continued folding and rotation, but the grounds for such an argument lay within a strongly held belief of area conservation; without conservation, faulting will likely compensate. The basic geometries of detachment faulting of a symmetric detachment fold are shown in Figure 4. Refer to Mitra for an evolutionary model of faulted detachment folds in the asymmetric and symmetric settings.

Faulting may occur in a symmetric or asymmetric fold, yielding fault geometries that are both alike and dissimilar. Faulting in either setting is reliant on the lock-up and strain accumulation of a fold typically at its critical angle. Asymmetric folding develops in the forelimb (the limb furthest from the source of thrust) of the fold and may either absorb strain into or transmit strain through the stratigraphic units composing the fold. A system that absorbs strain is recognized as a trishear zone being triangular in shape; while a parallel deformation zone transmits shear across the units of the fold and typically takes on the form of a parallelogram or is rectangular in geometry. These two deformation patterns may exist in a single fold and at some time during continued deformation may reconnect with the detachment. It is also the case that a backthrust may occur in an asymmetric fold geometry as shear across the forelimb due to rotation and migration of beds.

Symmetric faults were essentially covered previously under the name lift-off folds (see Figure 4). Progressive limb rotation and lock-up in a symmetric fold induces shear at both the forelimb and backlimb of the fold which may then result in faults on both limbs causing lift-off. Like the asymmetric fold faulting, as progressive slip along the basal detachment occurs, either the forelimb or backlimb (the limb closest to the source of thrust) thrust may reconnect with the basal detachment. For a more robust definition of faulting reference Mitra 2002.
