= Les Planches-en-Montagne =

Commune in Bourgogne-Franche-Comté, France

- Commune
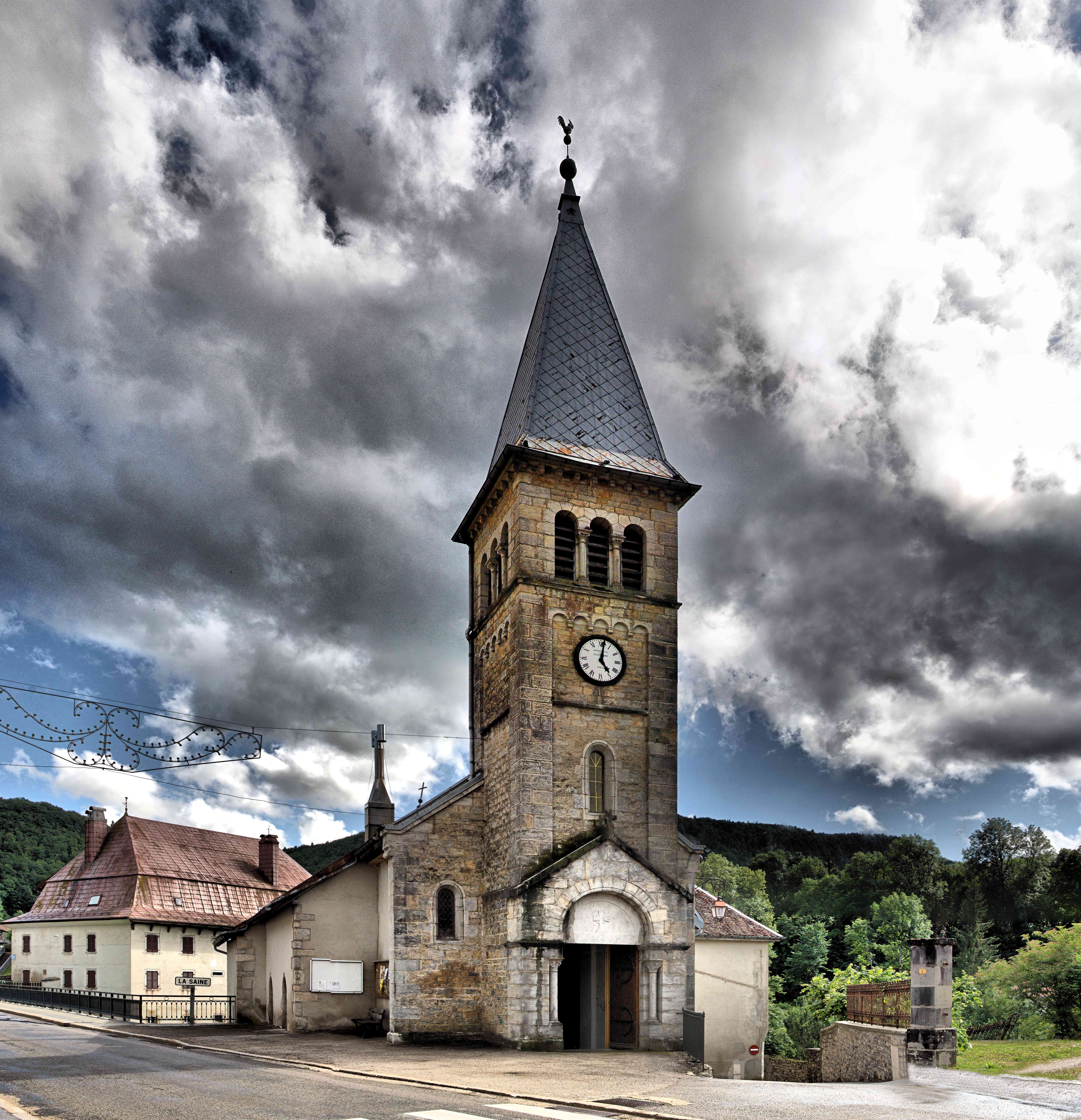
- The church in Les Planches-en-Montagne

- Coat of arms
- Location of Les Planches-en-Montagne
- Location within France Location within Bourgogne-Franche-Comté
- Coordinates: 46°39′19″N 6°00′35″E
- Country: France
- Region: Bourgogne-Franche-Comté
- Department: Jura
- Arrondissement: Lons-le-Saunier
- Canton: Saint-Laurent-en-Grandvaux

Government
  - Mayor (2020–2026): Gérard Cart-Lamy
- Area^{1}: 13.48 km^{2} (5.20 sq mi)
- Highest elevation: 1,061 m (3,481 ft)
- Lowest elevation: 570 m (1,870 ft)
- Population (2023): 152
  - Density: 11.3/km^{2} (29.2/sq mi)
- Time zone: UTC+01:00 (CET)
  - Summer (DST): UTC+02:00 (CEST)
- INSEE/Postal code: 39424 /39150
- ^{1} French Land Register data, which excludes lakes, ponds, glaciers > 1 km^{2} (0.386 sq mi or 247 acres) and river estuaries.

Les Planches-en-Montagne (French pronunciation: [le plɑ̃ʃ ɑ̃ mɔ̃taɲ]) is a commune in the Jura department in Bourgogne-Franche-Comté in eastern France. In 1973 it absorbed the former commune La Perrena.

== Population ==
Historical population
Year	Pop.	±% p.a.
1968	201	—
1975	186	−1.10%
1982	159	−2.22%
1990	145	−1.15%
1999	128	−1.38%
2007	150	+2.00%
2012	157	+0.92%
2017	164	+0.88%
2023	152	−1.26%
Source: INSEE

== See also ==
- Communes of the Jura department
