= List of mountains in Liechtenstein =

This is a list of mountains of Liechtenstein, they are all within the Rätikon range of the Eastern Alps.

Distribution of Liechtenstein's mountains

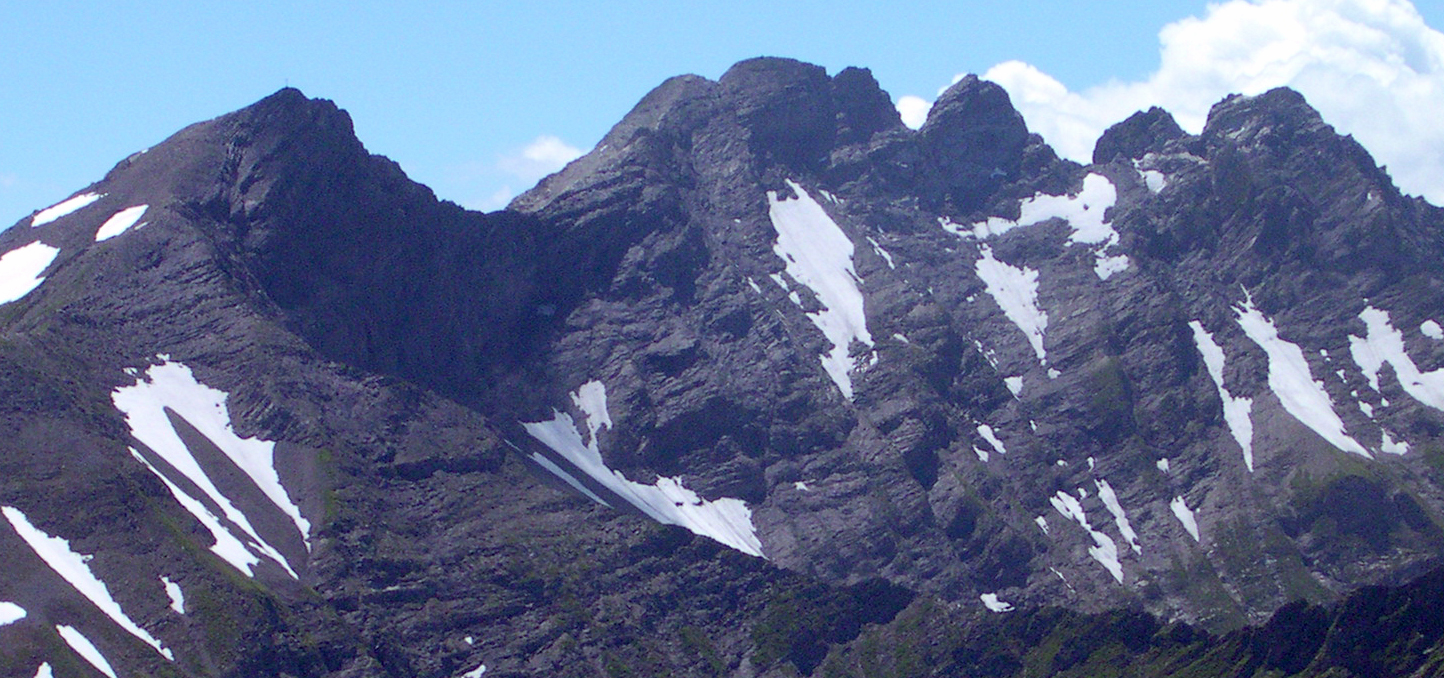
The ridge on the border of Liechtenstein and Switzerland containing Vorder and Hinter Grauspitz

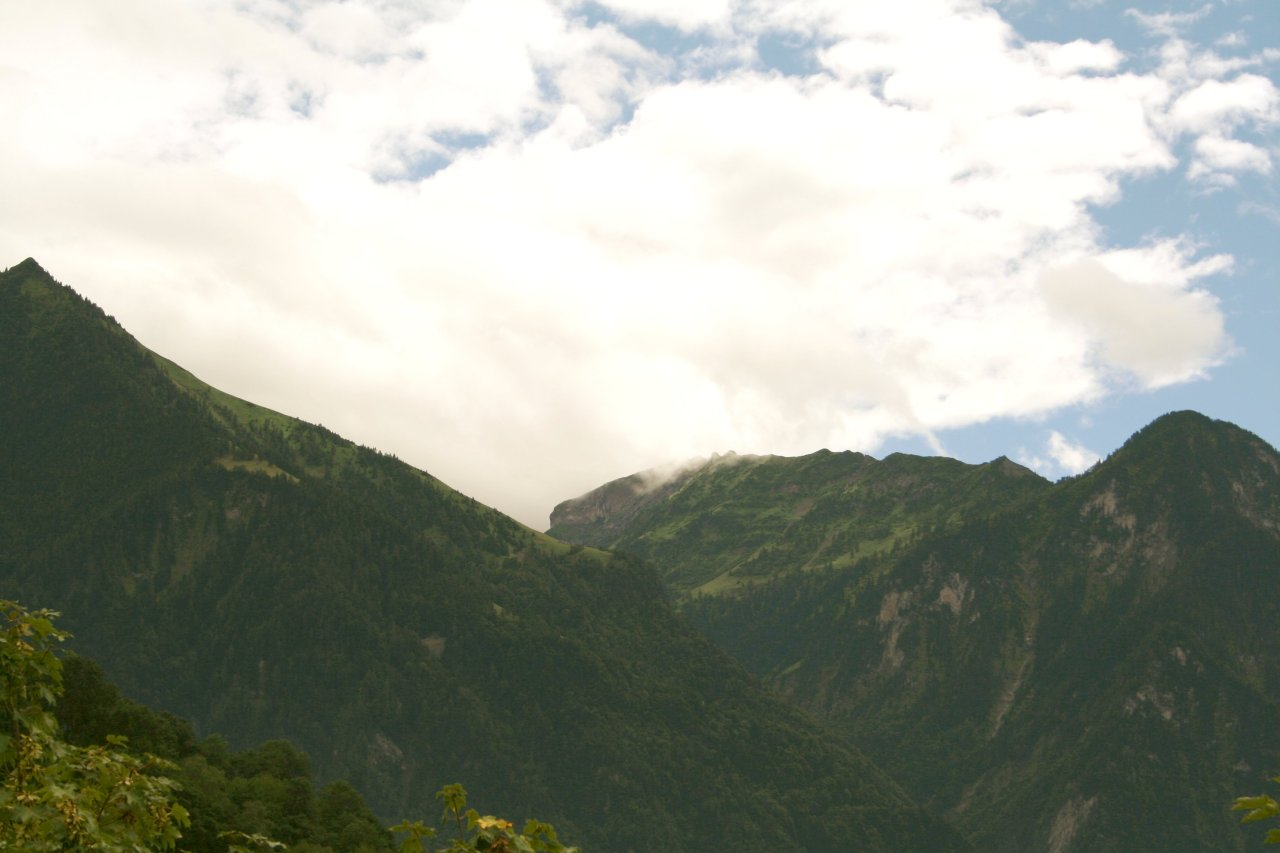
Koraspitz, Mazorakopf and Mittlerspitz (left to right)

Name	Height	Coordinates
Naafkopf	2570 m	47°3′38.54″N 9°36′25.75″E
Schwarzhorn	2574 m	47°3′17.4″N 9°35′17″E
Grauspitz	2599 m	47°3′10″N 9°34′55″E
Falknis	2560 m	47°3′1.9″N 9°33′52.3″E
Falknishorn (Mazorakopf)	2451 m	47°2′54.52″N 9°33′25.17″E
Mittlerspitz	1897 m	47°3′54″N 9°32′23″E
Mittagspitz	1857 m	47°4′9″N 9°32′3″E
Koraspitz	1927 m	47°4′45″N 9°33′28″E
Langspitz	2006 m	47°4′43.7″N 9°33′43.1″E
Goldlochspitz	2110 m	47°4′57″N 9°34′2″E
Kulmi / Kolme	1993 m	47°5′15″N 9°34′20″E
Heubühl	1936 m	47°5′46″N 9°34′0.9″E
Plasteikopf	2356 m	47°3′55″N 9°34′38″E
Augstenberg	2359 m	47°4′57″N 9°36′36″E
Gamsgrat	2201 m	47°6′38″N 9°37′14″E
Ochsenkopf	2286 m	47°6′53″N 9°37′28″E
Scheienkopf	2159 m (summit in Austria)	47°7′43″N 9°38′8″E
Stachlerkopf	2071 m	47°7′18.6″N 9°35′32.5″E
Schönberg	2104 m	47°7′49.3″N 9°35′34.6″E
Galinakopf	2198 m	47°9′6″N 9°37′14″E
Kuhgrat (Kuegrat)	2123 m	47°10′0″N 9°34′0″E
Garsellakopf (Garsellikopf)	2105 m	47°10′13″N 9°33′53″E
Drei Schwestern	2052 m	47°10′32″N 9°34′22″E
Sarojahöhe (Saroja)	1659 m	47°11′27″N 9°34′21″E
Gafleispitz	2000 m	47°9′31″N 9°33′17″E
Alpspitz	1942 m	47°8′55″N 9°33′14″E
Helwangspitz	2000 m	47°8′55″N 9°33′44″E
Gorfion	2308 m	47°4′41″N 9°37′7″E
Silberhorn / Hubel	2150 m	47°5′14.7″N 9°36′20.1″E
Nospitz	2091 m	47°5′35.3″N 9°35′54.1″E
Rappenstein	2221 m	47°4′35″N 9°34′0″E
Rotspitz	2127 m	47°3′30″N 9°33′5″E
Würznerhorn	1713 m	47°3′46″N 9°31′52″E
Sattelköpfle	1688 m	47°11′8.3″N 9°34′23.7″E
Zigerbergkopf	2051 m	47°9′4″N 9°36′12″E
Kirchlespitz	1929 m	47°6′11.7″N 9°35′21″E
Spitz	2186 m	47°5′12.3″N 9°37′26.5″E
Maurerberg / Mauerer Berg	1378 m	47°12′18″N 9°35′5″E
Rauher Berg	2094 m	47°6′27″N 9°37′42″E
Drei Kapuziner	2084 m	47°7′27.9″N 9°35′20″E
