= Gafleispitz =

Mountain in Liechtenstein

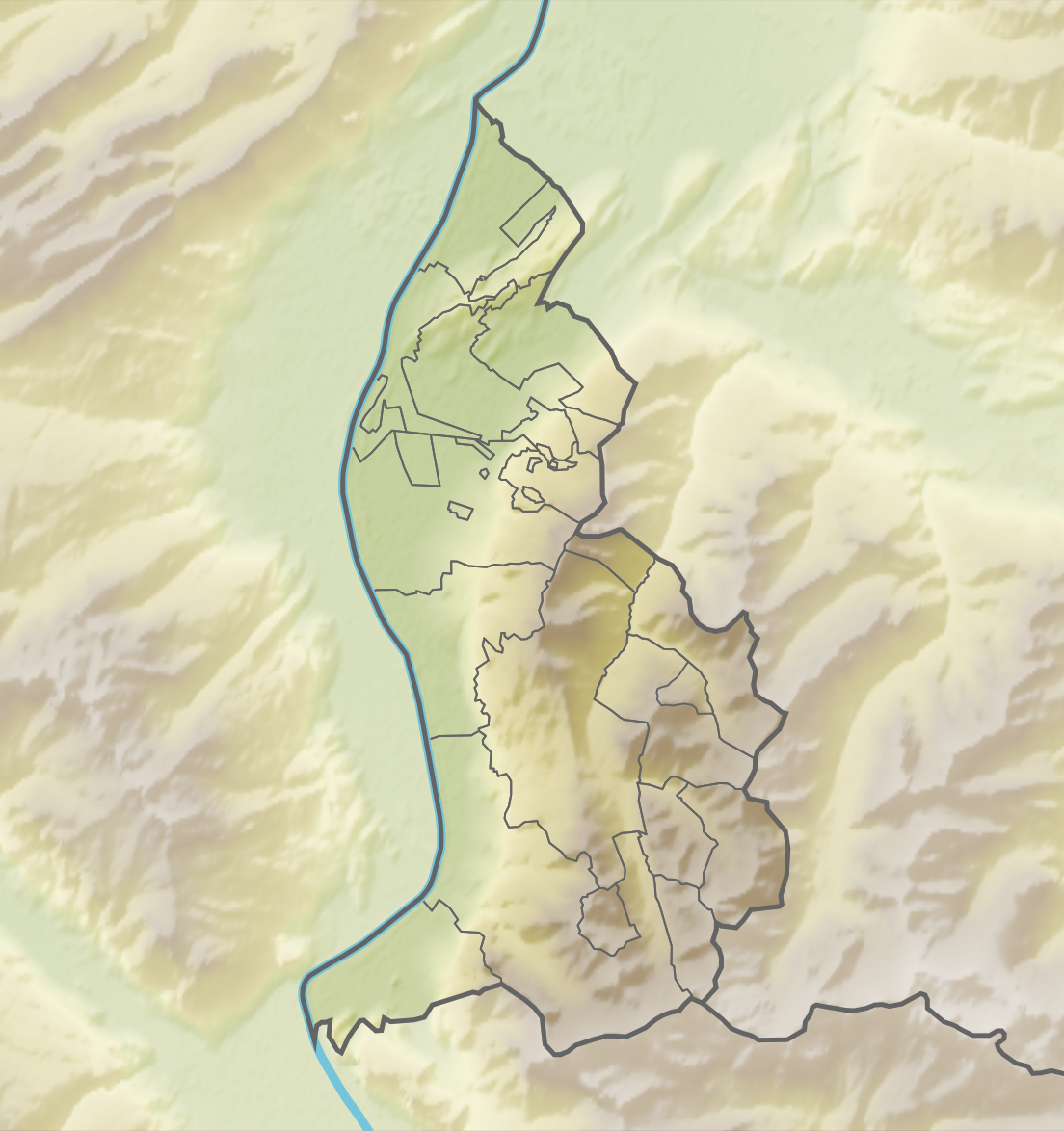
- Location within Liechtenstein

Highest point
- Elevation: 2,000 m (6,600 ft)
- Coordinates: 47°9′32″N 9°33′18″E

Geography
- Location: Liechtenstein
- Parent range: Rätikon, Alps

Gafleispitz is a mountain in Liechtenstein in the Rätikon range of the Eastern Alps, to the east of Schaan, with a height of 2,000 metres (6,600 ft).
