= Kirchlespitz =

Mountain in Liechtenstein

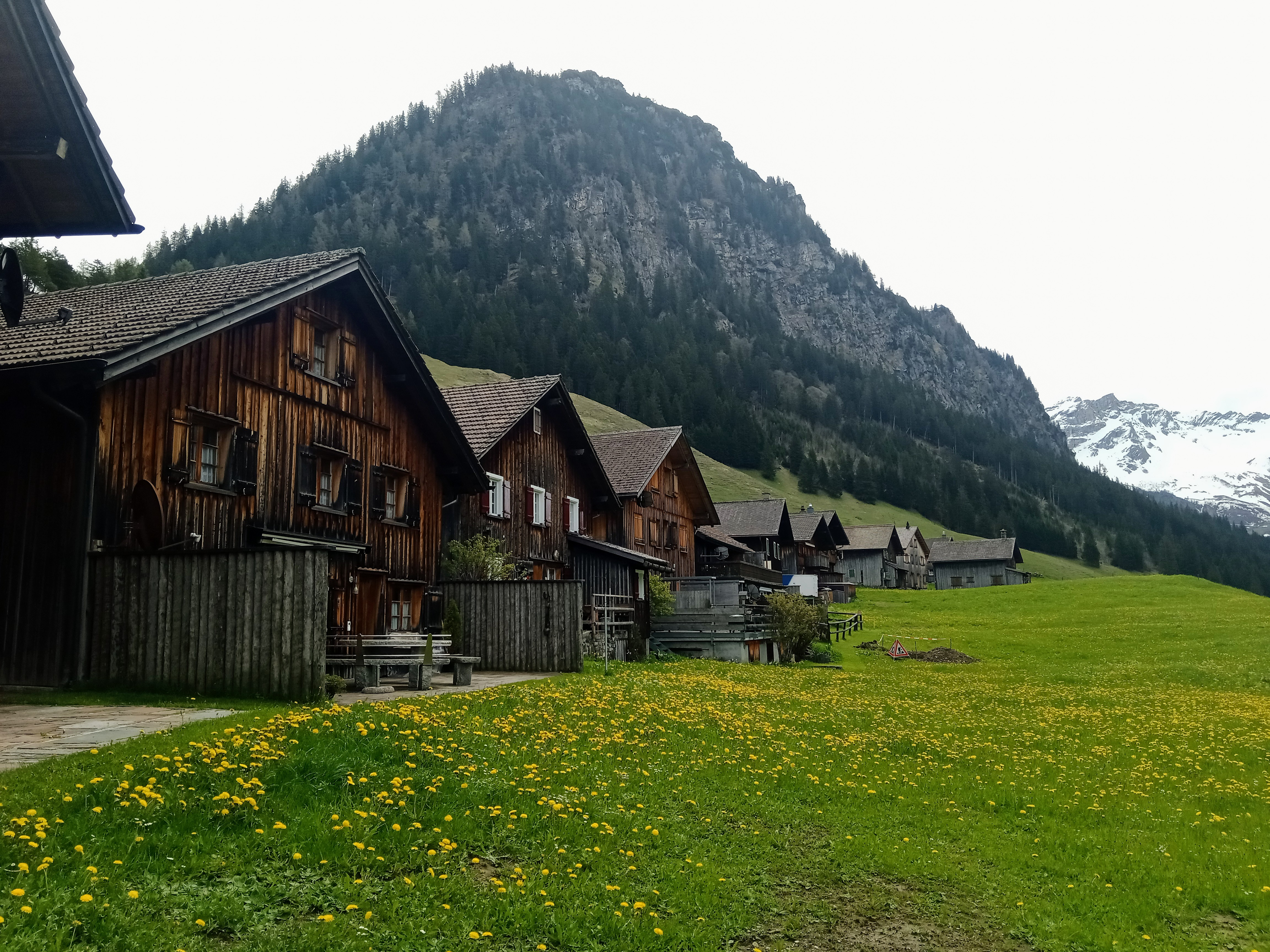

Highest point
- Elevation: 1,929 m (6,329 ft)
- Coordinates: 47°06′11.7″N 9°35′21″E

Geography
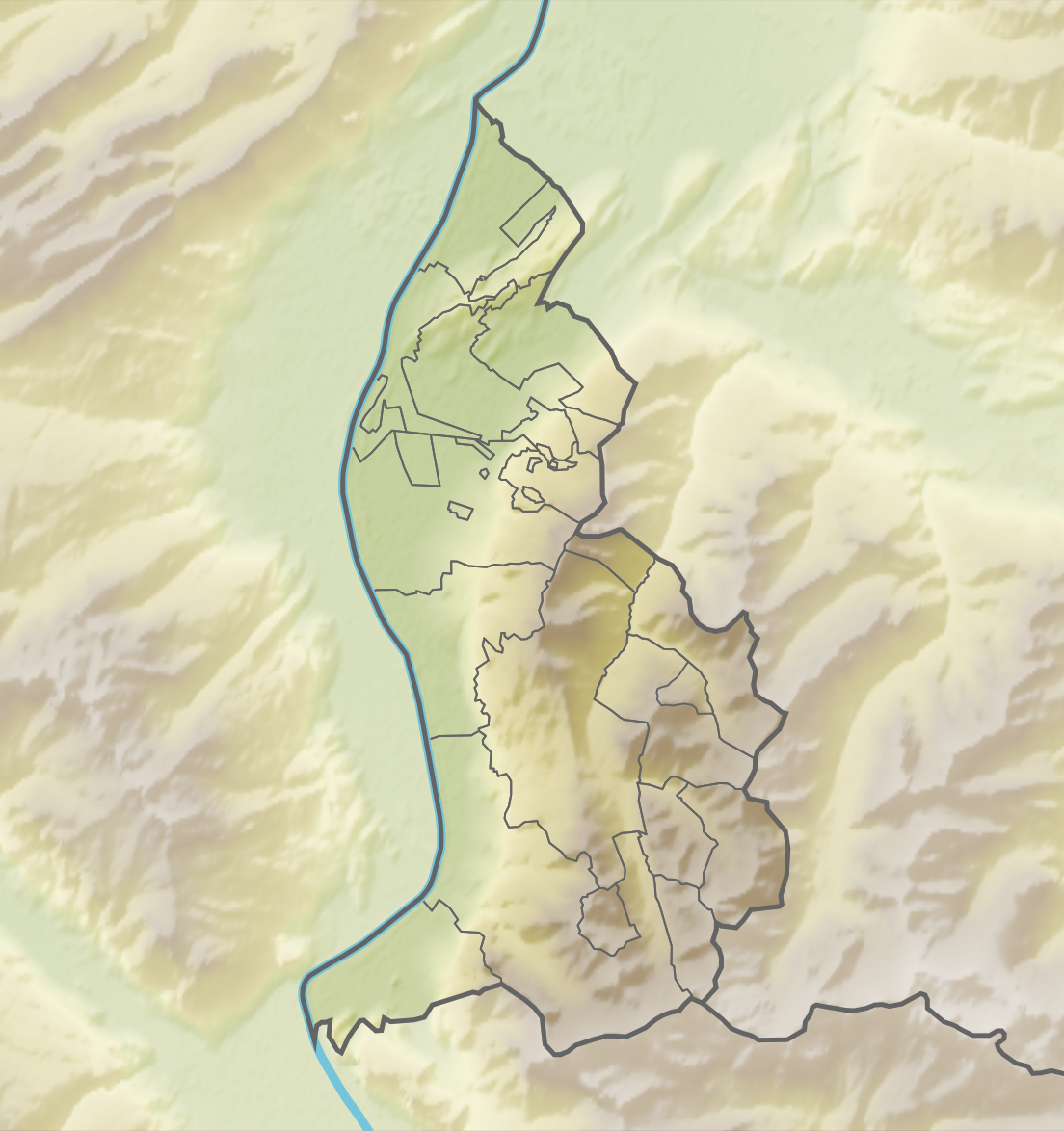
- Location within Liechtenstein
- Location: Liechtenstein
- Parent range: Rätikon, Alps

Kirchlespitz is a mountain in Liechtenstein in the Rätikon range of the Eastern Alps between Malbun and Steg, with a height of 1,929 metres (6,329 ft).
