= Zigerbergkopf =

Mountain in Austria and Liechtenstein

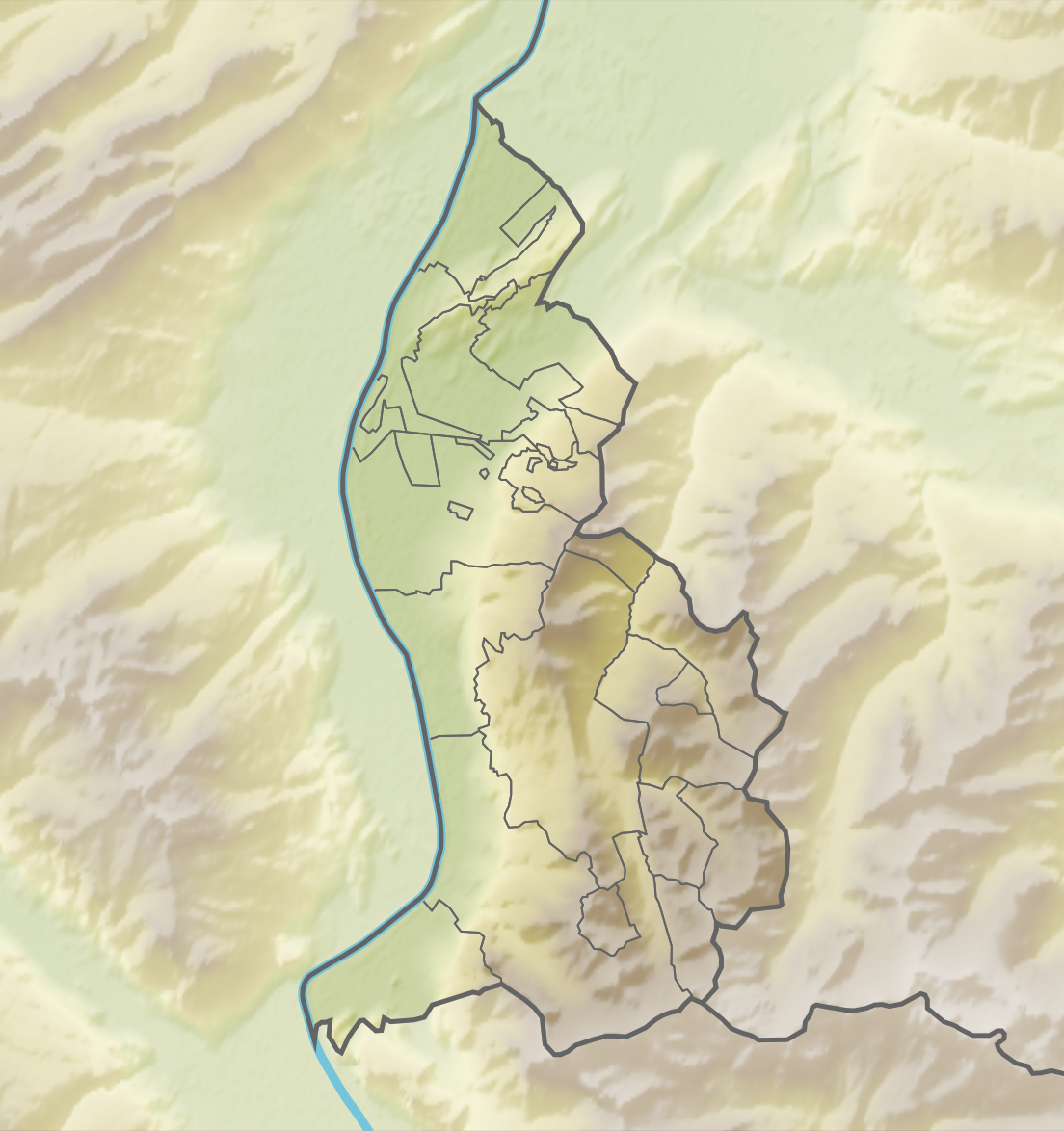
- Location within Liechtenstein

Highest point
- Elevation: 2,051 m (6,729 ft)
- Coordinates: 47°9′4″N 9°36′12″E

Geography
- Location: Liechtenstein / Austria
- Parent range: Rätikon, Alps

Zigerbergkopf is a mountain on the border of Austria and Liechtenstein in the Rätikon range of the Eastern Alps with a height of 2,051 metres (6,729 ft).
