= Scheienkopf =

Mountain in Austria and Liechtenstein

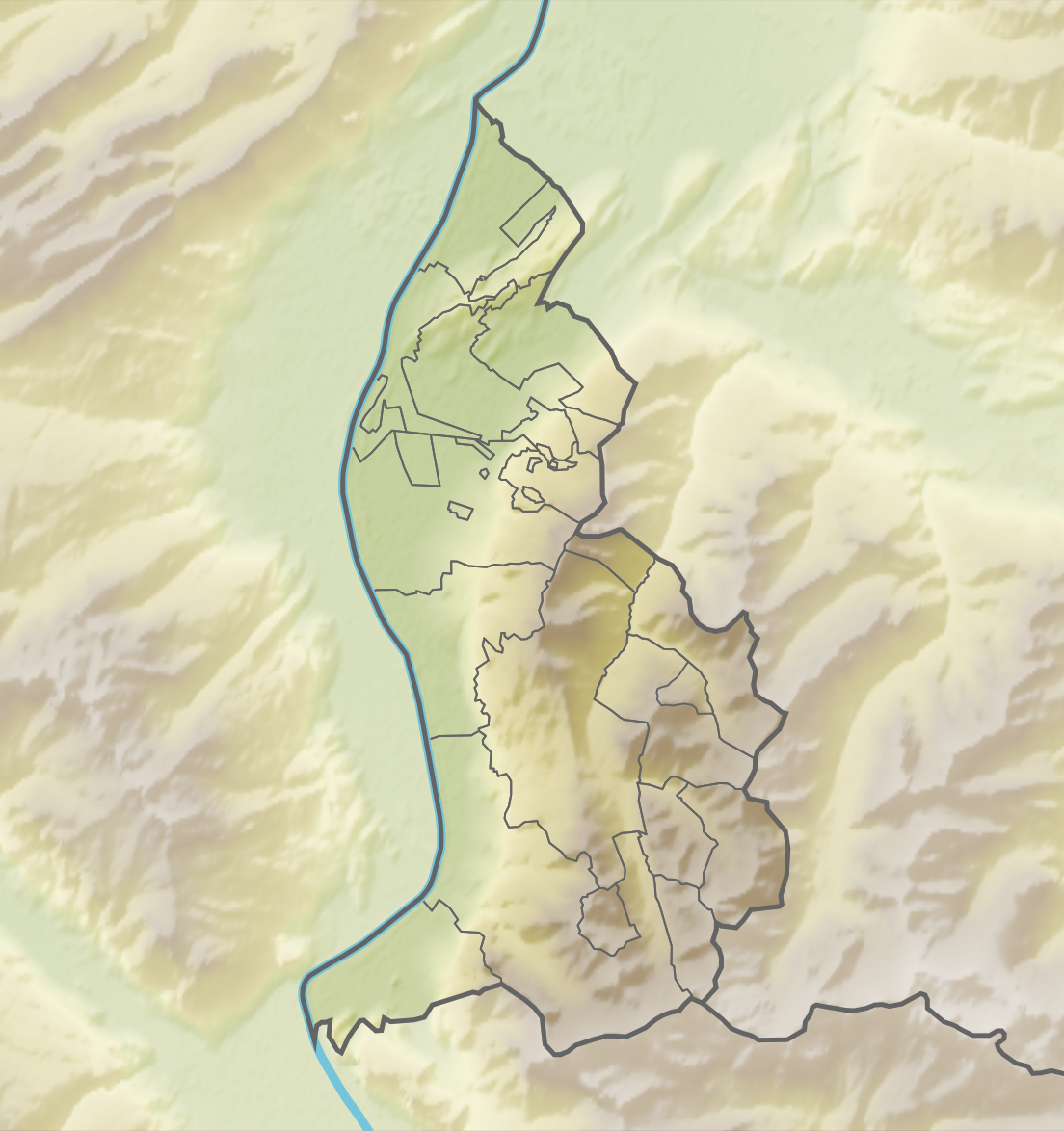
- Location within Liechtenstein

Highest point
- Elevation: 2,159 m (7,083 ft)
- Coordinates: 47°07′43″N 9°38′08″E

Geography
- Location: Liechtenstein / Austria
- Parent range: Rätikon, Alps

Scheienkopf is a mountain on the border of Liechtenstein and Austria, although the summit is in Austria, in the Rätikon range of the Eastern Alps with a height of 2,159 metres (7,083 ft).

The mountain is located in the eastern part of Liechtenstein. To the east of the capital - Vaduz, at its foot lies the commune-community Balzers (its pre-Austrian enclave). The top of the mountain is already listed on the territory of Austria.
