= Nospitz =

Mountain in Liechtenstein

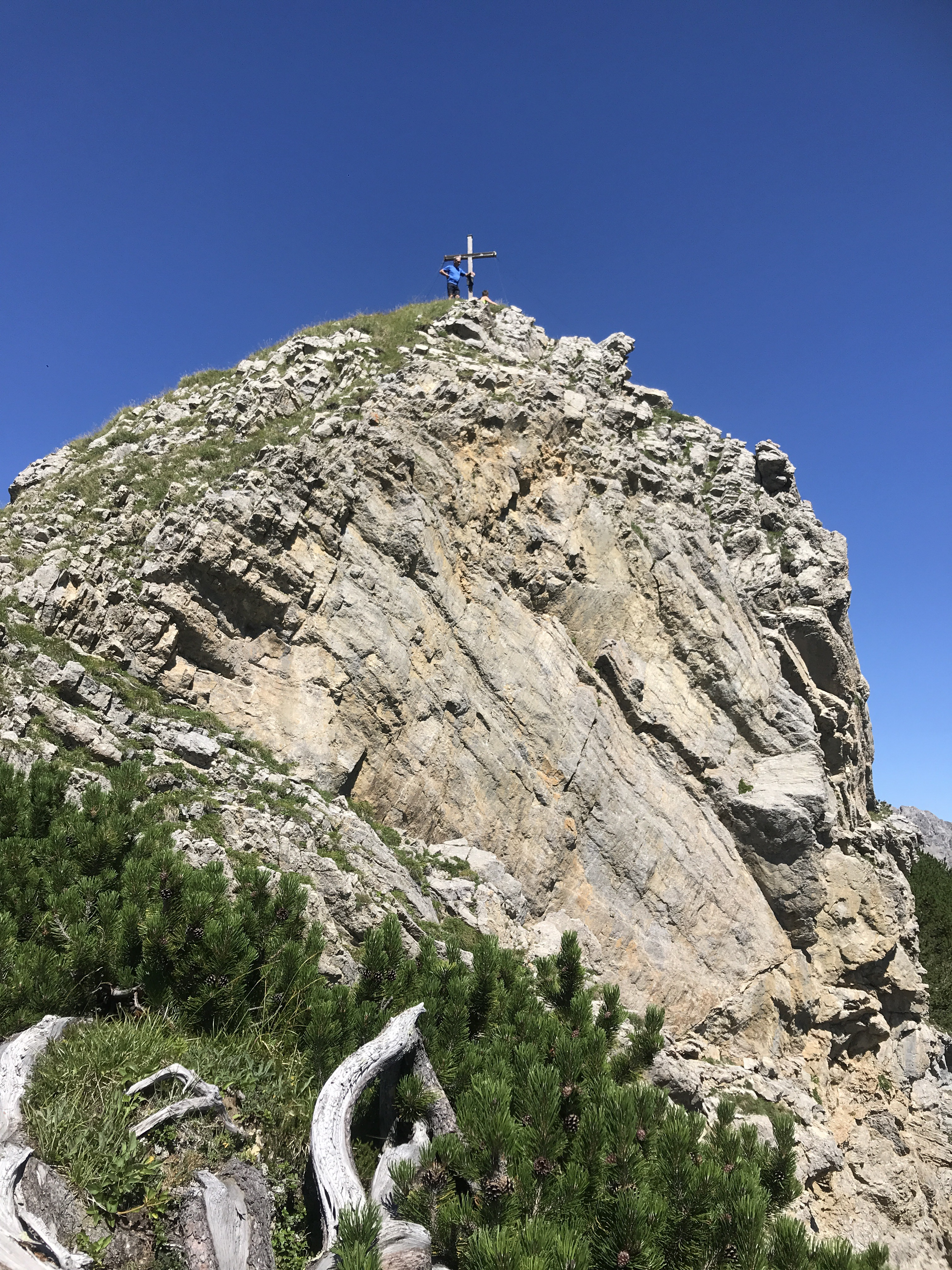

Highest point
- Elevation: 2,091 m (6,860 ft)
- Coordinates: 47°05′35″N 9°35′54″E

Geography
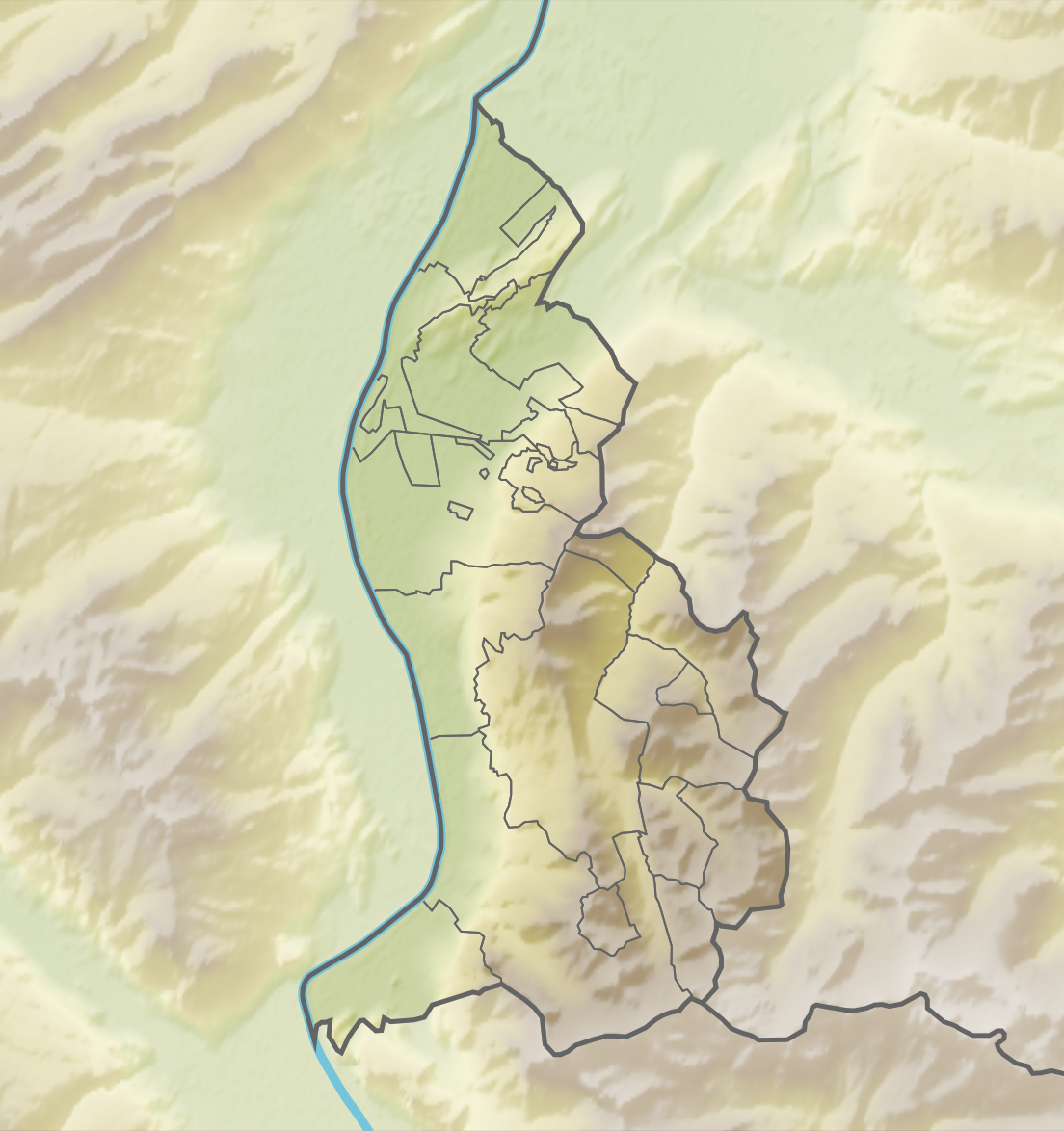
- Location within Liechtenstein
- Location: Liechtenstein
- Parent range: Rätikon, Alps

Nospitz is a mountain in Liechtenstein in the Rätikon range of the Eastern Alps close to the town of Malbun, with a height of 2,091 metres (6,860 ft).
