= Plasteikopf =

Mountain in Liechtenstein

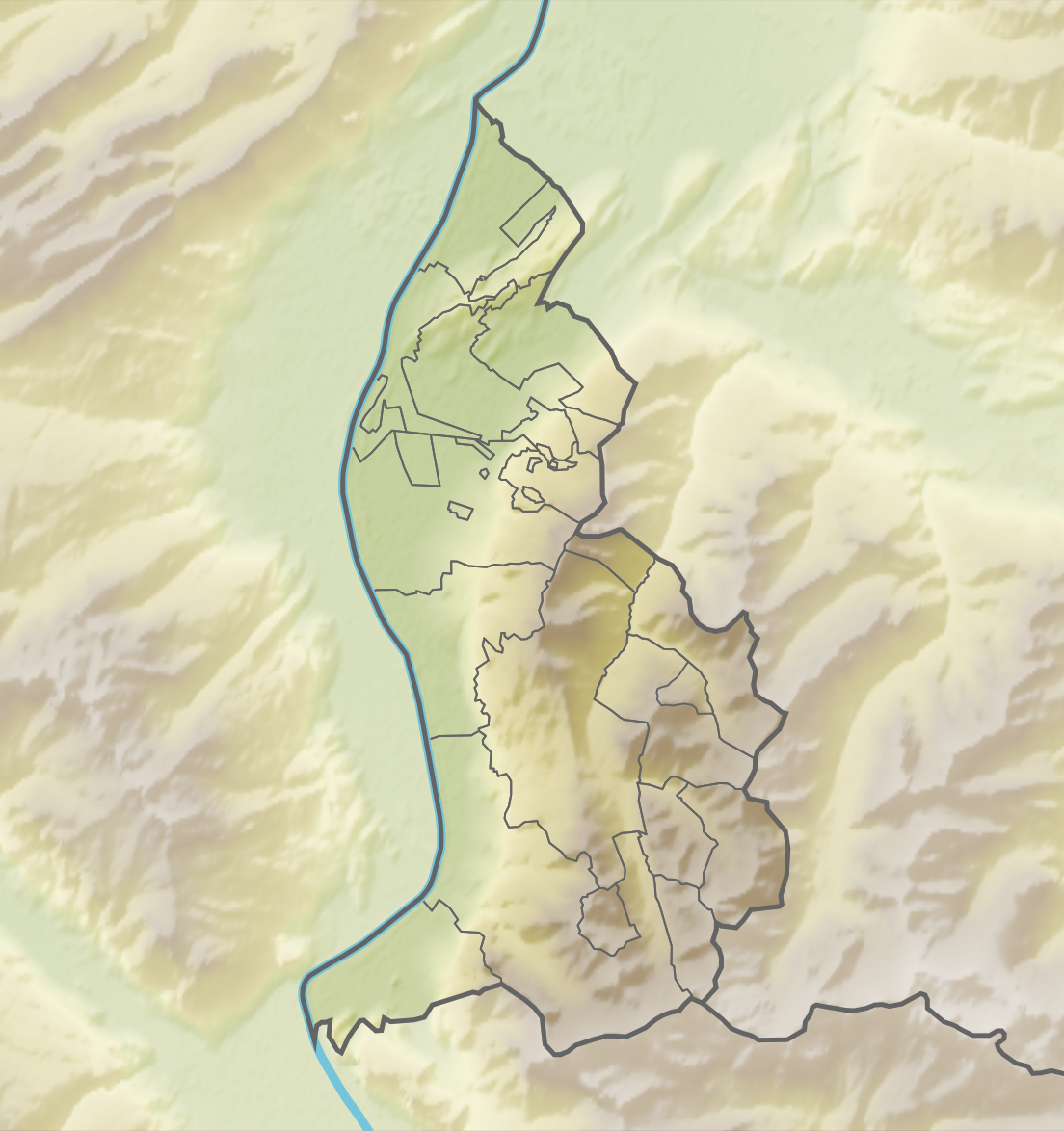
- Location within Liechtenstein

Highest point
- Elevation: 2,356 m (7,730 ft)
- Coordinates: 47°03′55″N 9°34′38″E

Geography
- Location: Liechtenstein
- Parent range: Rätikon, Alps

Plasteikopf is a mountain in Liechtenstein in the Rätikon range of the Eastern Alps close to the border with Switzerland, with a height of 2,356 metres (7,730 ft).
