= Maurerberg =

Mountain in Austria and Liechtenstein

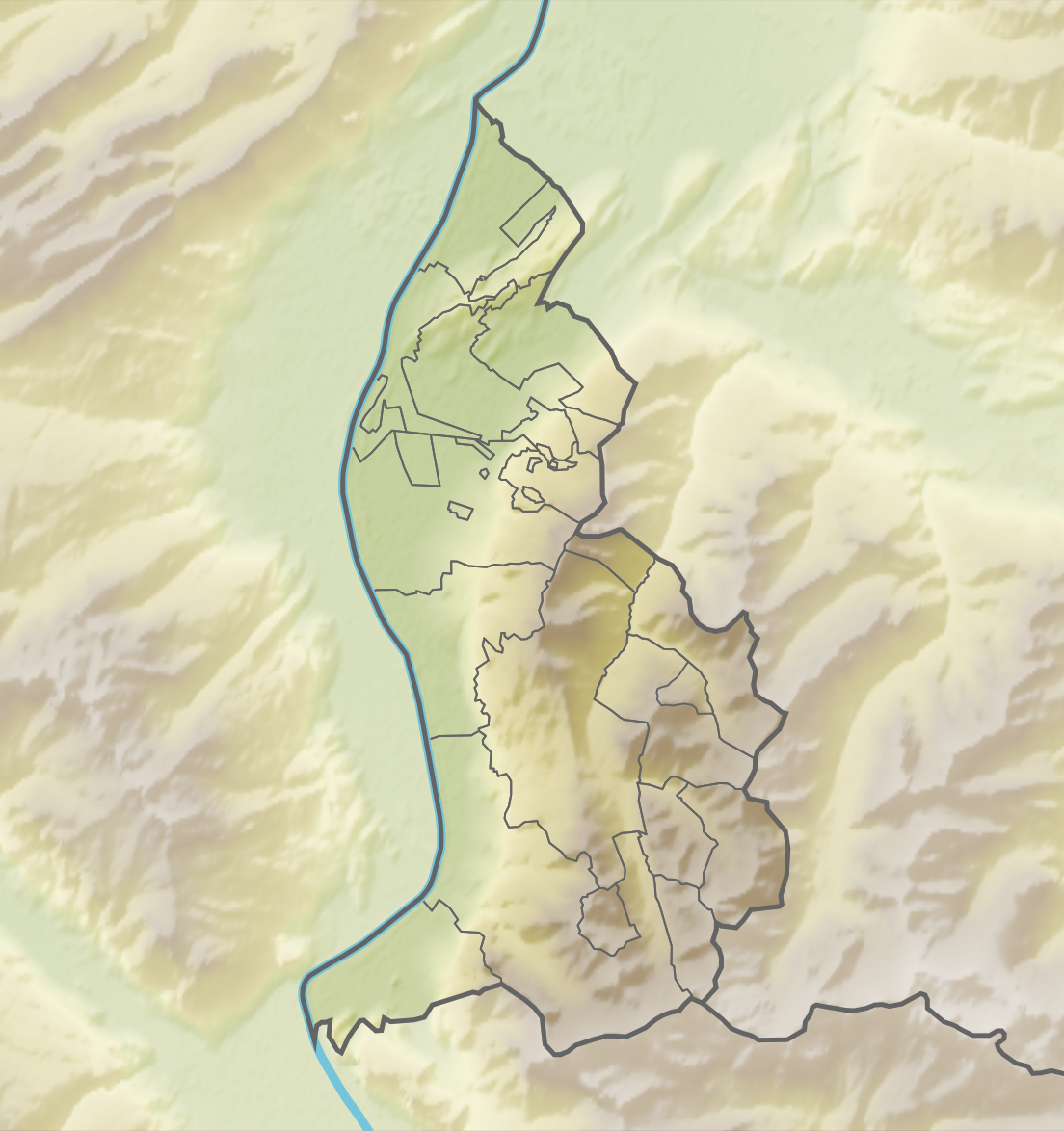
- Location within Liechtenstein

Highest point
- Elevation: 1,378 m (4,521 ft)
- Coordinates: 47°12′18″N 9°35′5″E

Geography
- Location: Liechtenstein / Austria
- Parent range: Rätikon, Alps

Maurerberg or Mauerer Berg is a mountain on the border of Liechtenstein and Austria in the Rätikon range of the Eastern Alps to the southeast of the town of Schaanwald, with a height of 1,378 metres (4,521 ft).
