= Spitz (Liechtenstein) =

Mountain in Liechtenstein

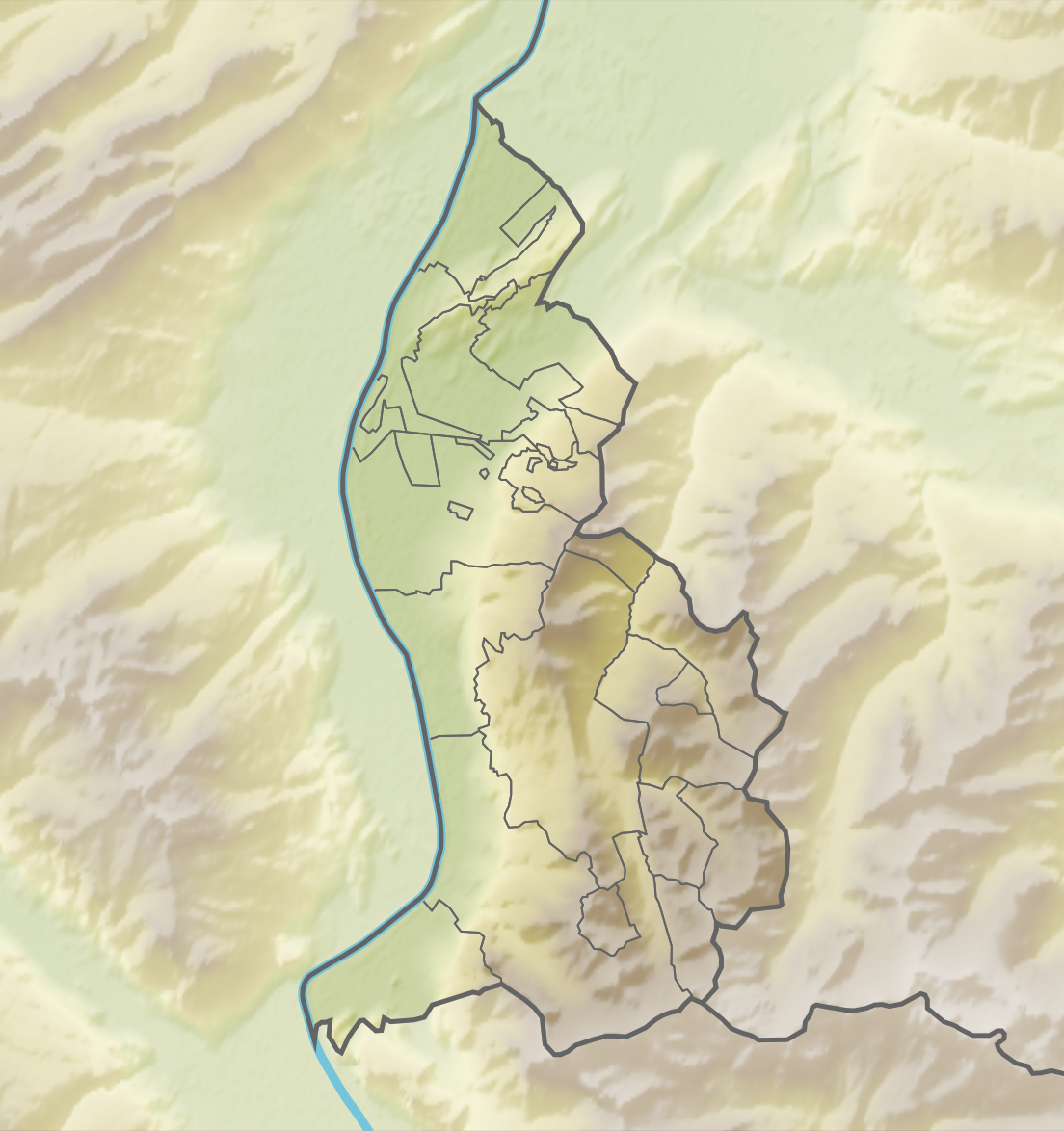
- Location within Liechtenstein

Highest point
- Elevation: 2,186 m (7,172 ft)
- Coordinates: 47°5′12.3″N 9°37′26.5″E

Geography
- Location: Location in Liechtenstein
- Parent range: Rätikon, Alps

Spitz is a mountain in Liechtenstein in the Rätikon range of the Eastern Alps close to the border with Austria and the town of Malbun with a height of 2,186 metres (7,172 ft).
