= Gamsgrat =

Mountain on the border of Liechtenstein and Austria

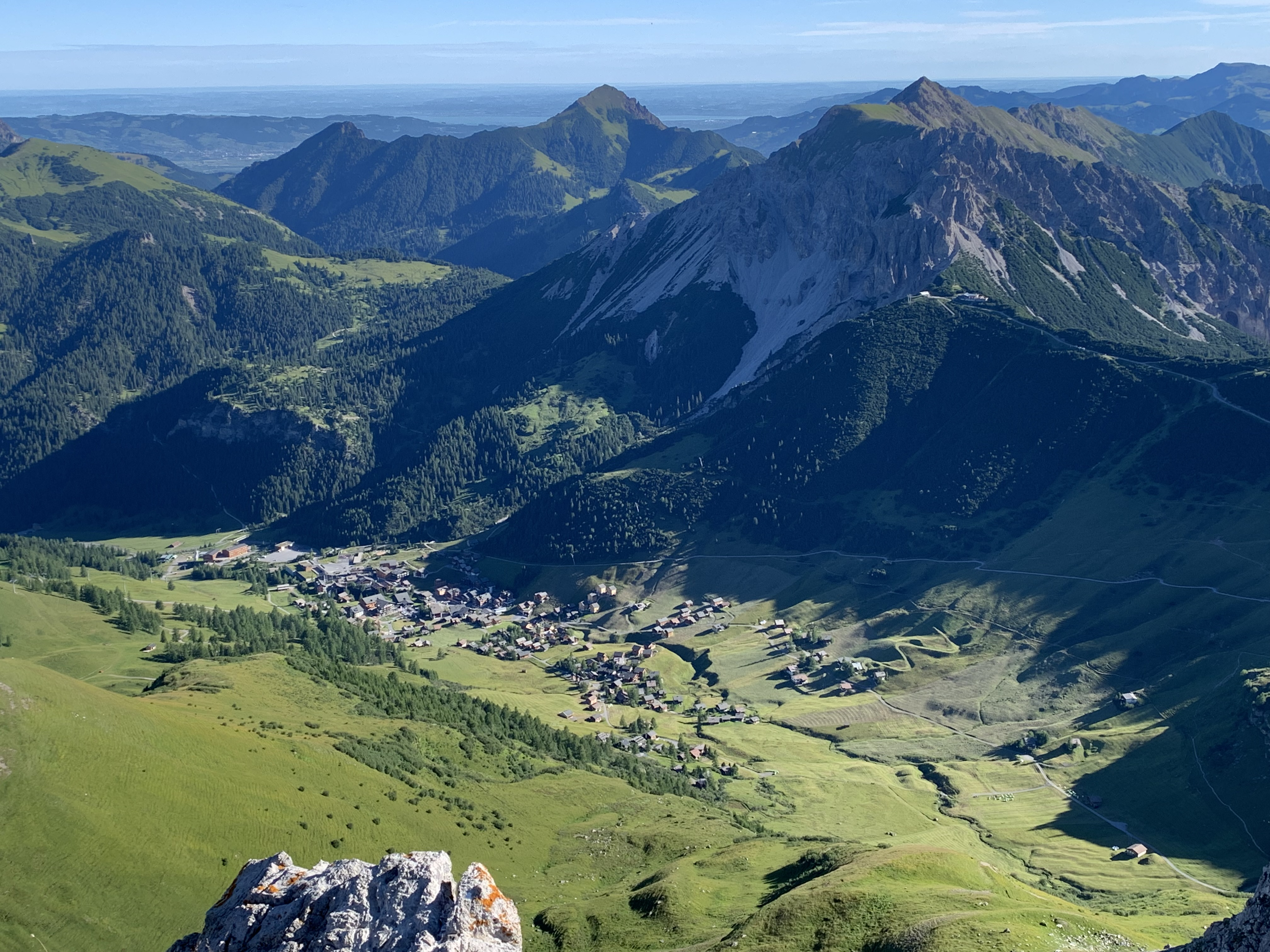
- Village of Malbun and Gamsgrat seen from Augstenberg

Highest point
- Elevation: 2,246 m (7,369 ft) or 2,201 metres (7,221 ft)
- Coordinates: 47°06′38″N 9°37′14″E

Geography
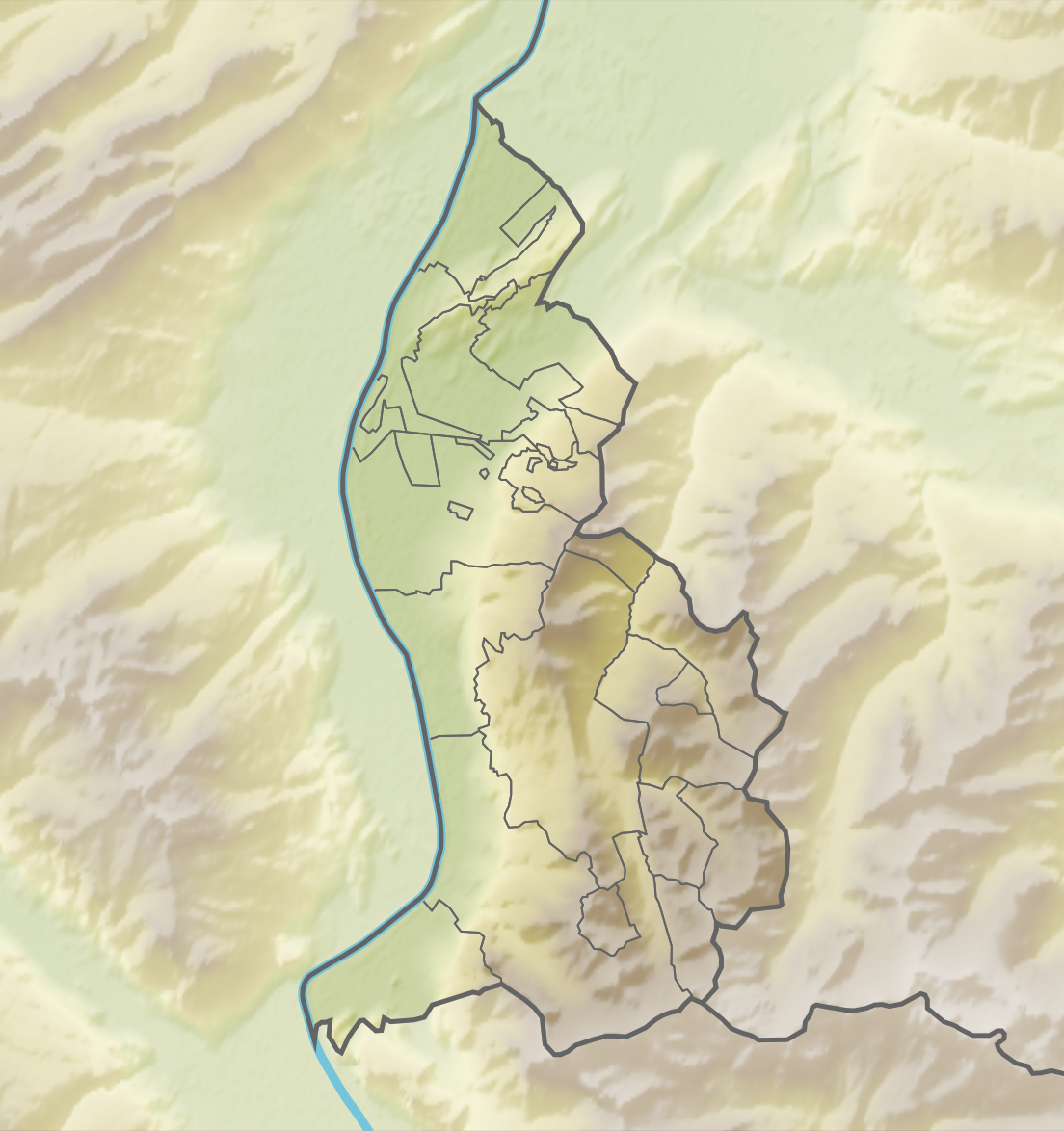
- Location within Liechtenstein
- Location: Liechtenstein / Austria
- Parent range: Rätikon, Alps

Gamsgrat is a mountain on the border of Liechtenstein and Austria in the Rätikon range of the Eastern Alps close to the town of Malbun, with a height of 2,246 metres (7,369 ft).
