= Rotspitz =

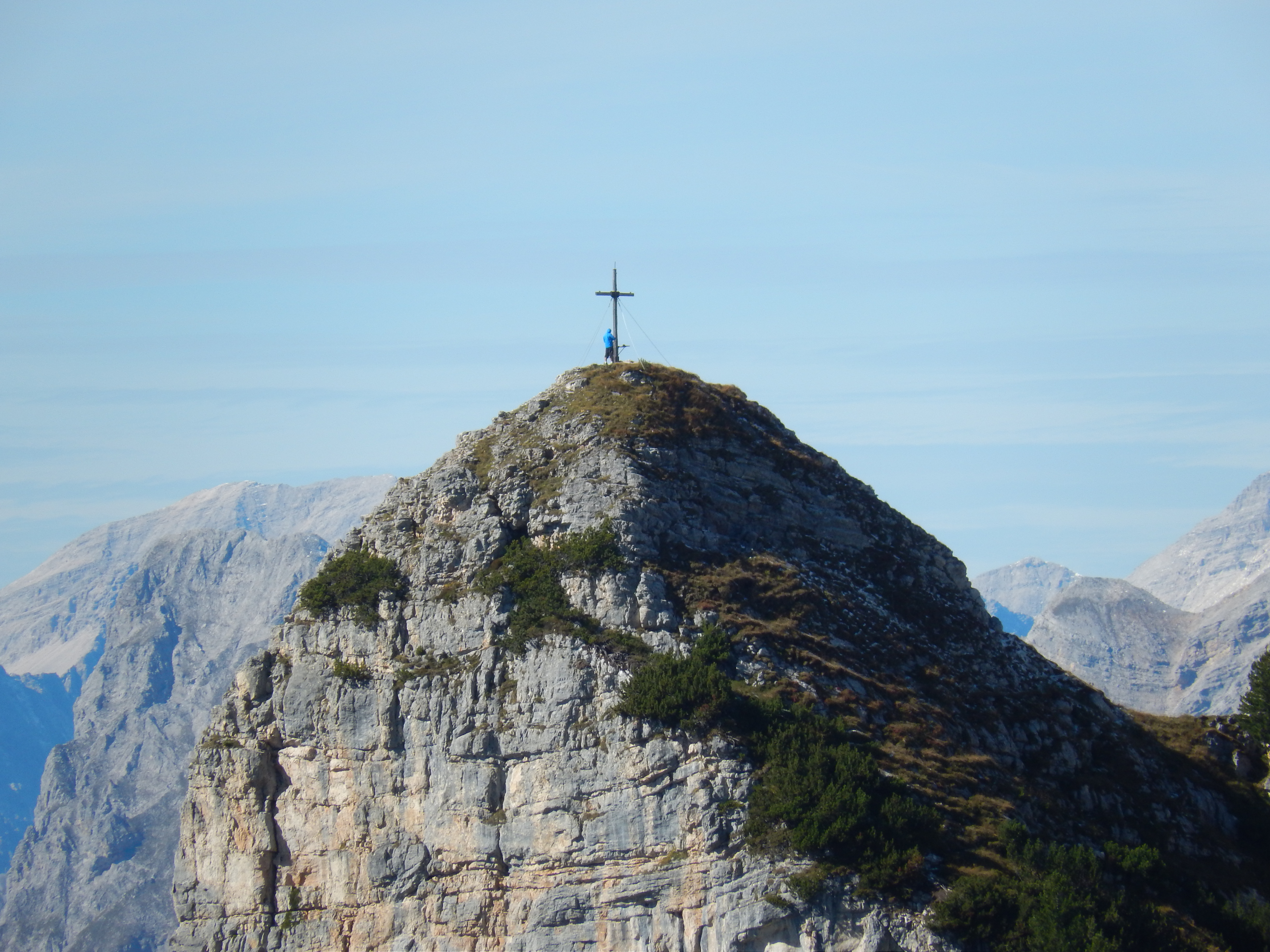

Highest point
- Elevation: 2,127 m (6,978 ft)
- Coordinates: 47°03′30″N 9°33′05″E

Geography
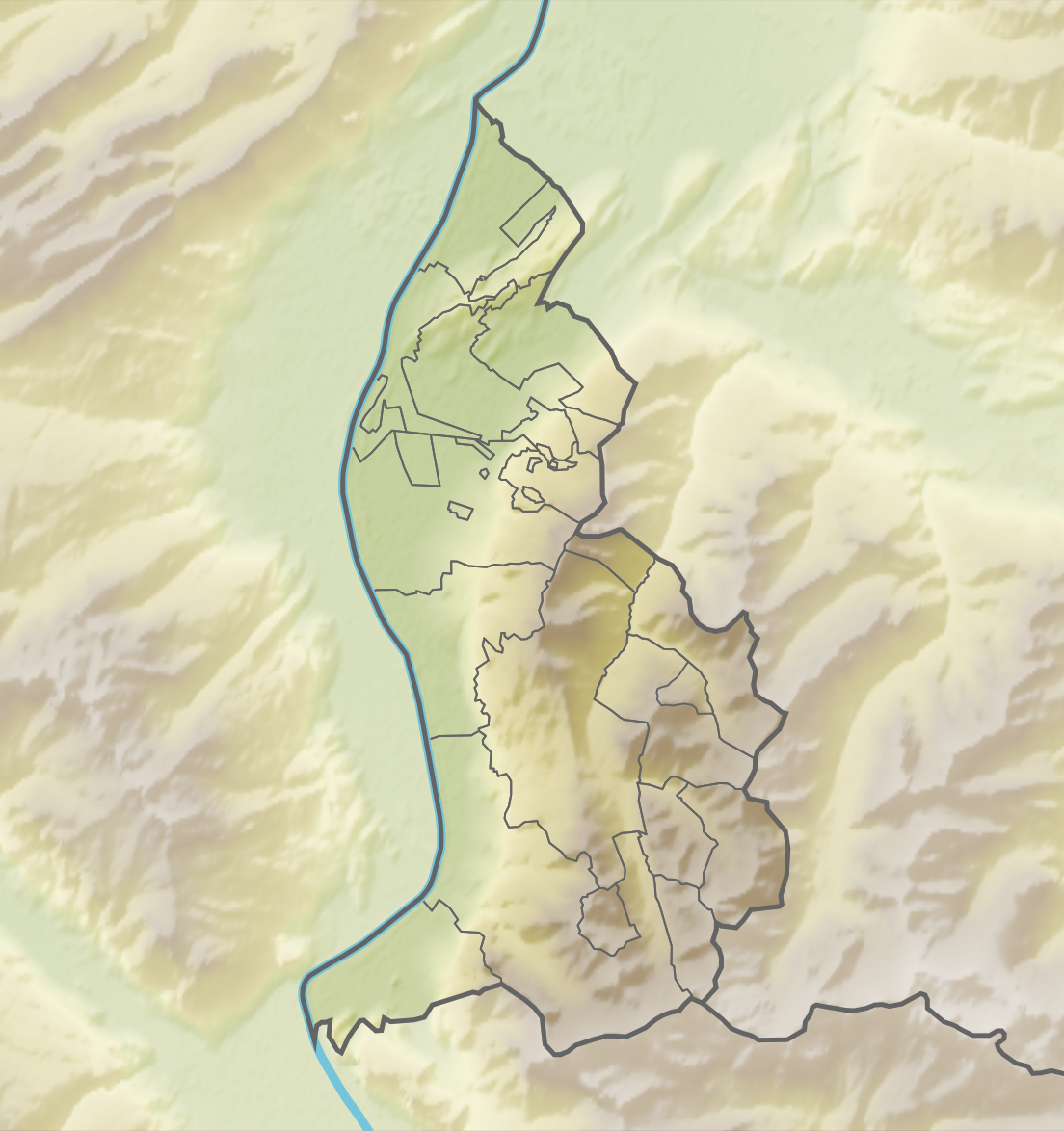
- Location within Liechtenstein
- Location: Location in Liechtenstein
- Parent range: Rätikon, Alps

Rotspitz (literally redpeak) is a mountain in Liechtenstein, located close to the Swiss border, due east of the Swiss town of Wartau. It is in the Rätikon range of the Eastern Alps, and reaches a height of 2,127 metres (6,978 ft).
