= Alpspitz =

Mountain in Liechtenstein

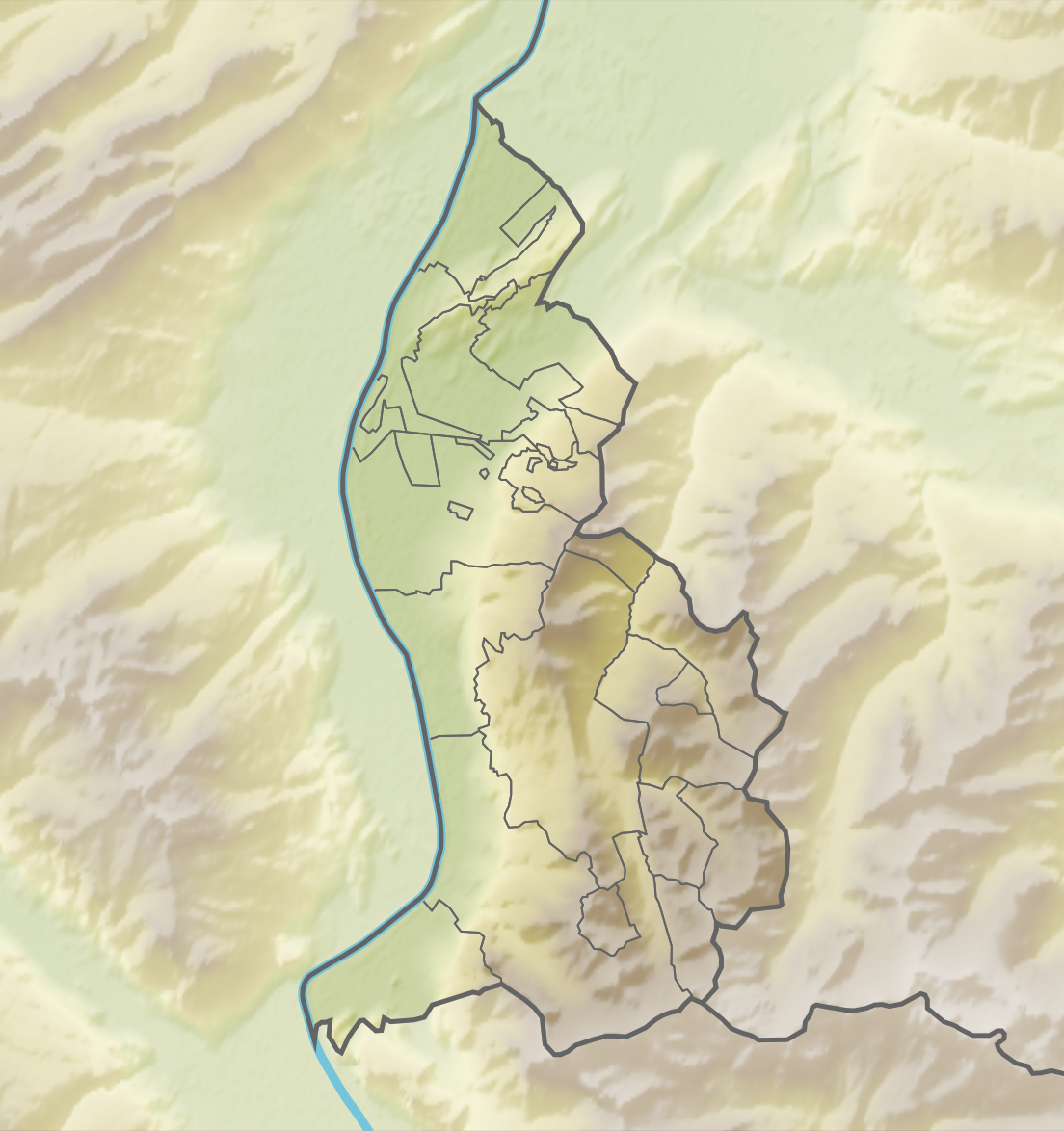
- Location within Liechtenstein

Highest point
- Elevation: 1,943 m (6,375 ft)
- Coordinates: 47°8′55″N 9°33′14″E

Geography
- Location: Liechtenstein
- Parent range: Rätikon, Alps

Alpspitz is a mountain in Liechtenstein in the Rätikon range of the Eastern Alps, to the east of Vaduz, with a height of 1,943 metres (6,375 ft) or 1,942 metres (6,371 ft).
