= Koraspitz =

Mountain in Lichtenstein

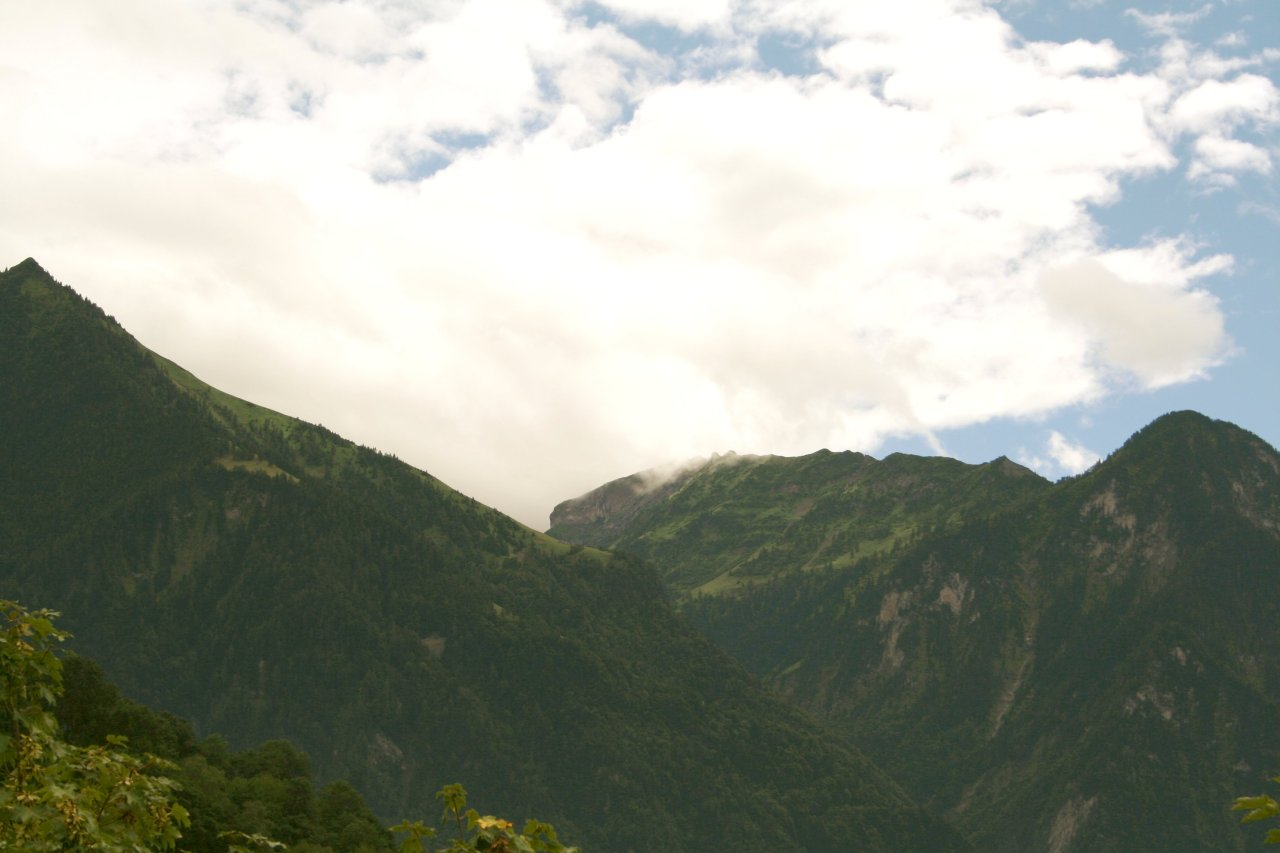
- Koraspitz (left), Mazorakopf and Mittlerspitz

Highest point
- Elevation: 1,927 m (6,322 ft)
- Coordinates: 47°4′45″N 9°33′28″E

Geography
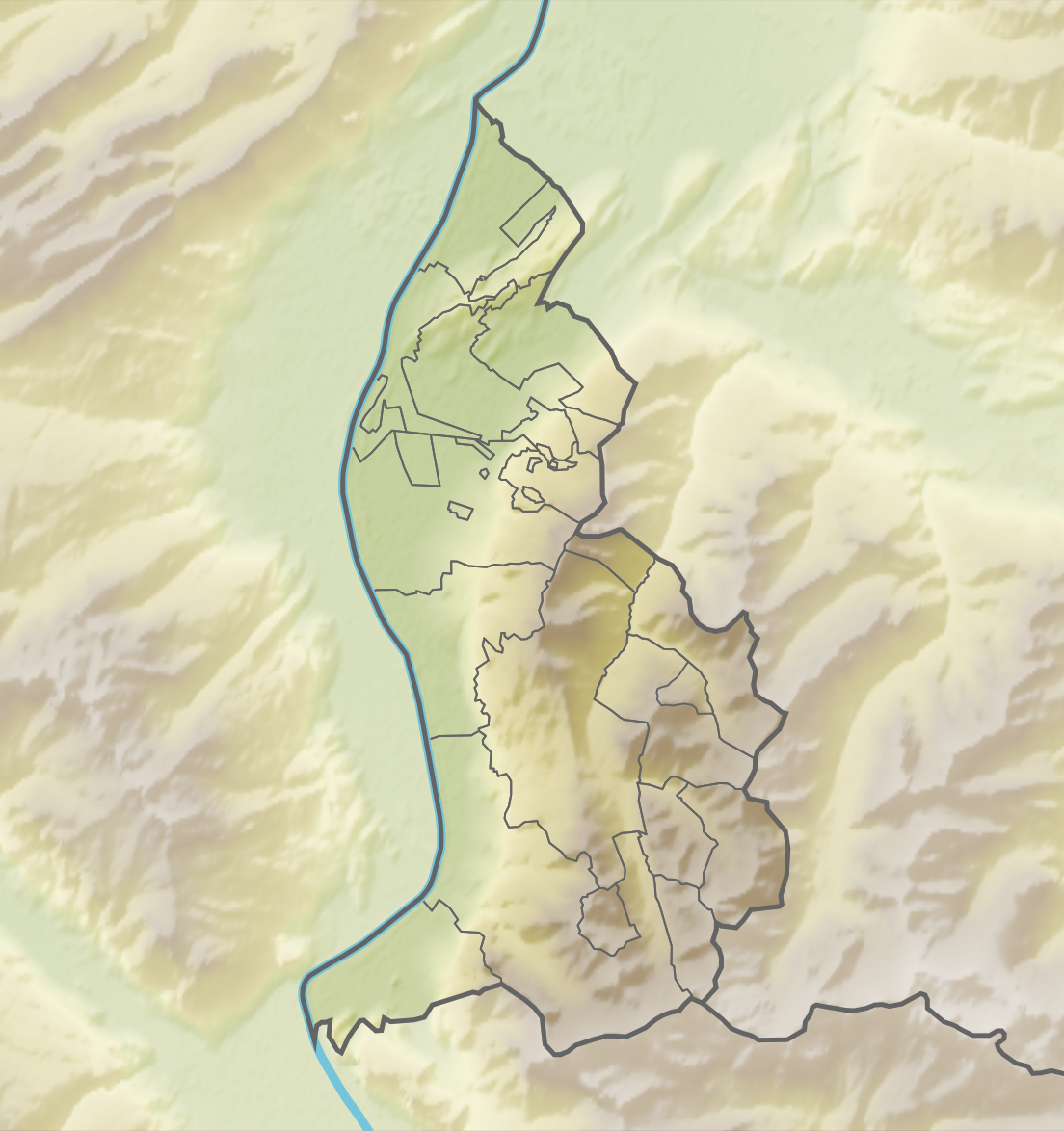
- Location within Liechtenstein
- Location: Liechtenstein
- Parent range: Rätikon, Alps

Koraspitz is a mountain in Liechtenstein in the Rätikon range of the Eastern Alps with a height of 1,927 metres (6,322 ft).
