= Schwarzhorn (Rätikon) =

Mountain in Liechtenstein and Switzerland

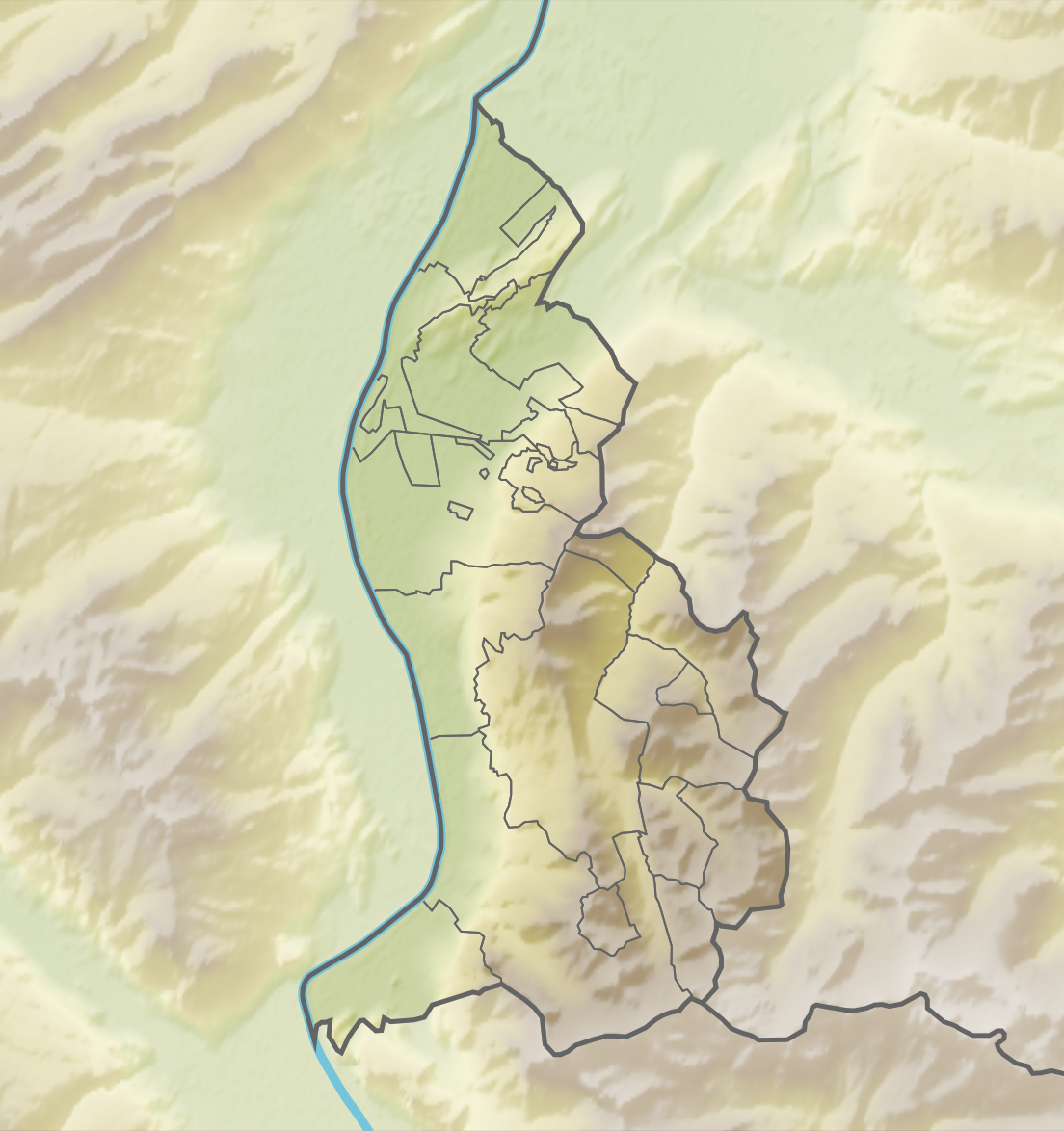
- Location within Liechtenstein

Highest point
- Elevation: 2,573 or 2,574 m (8,442 or 8,445 ft)
- Prominence: 72 m (236 ft)
- Coordinates: 47°3′17.4″N 9°35′17.0″E

Naming
- Language of name: German

Geography
- Location: Triesen, Liechtenstein; Graubünden, Switzerland
- Parent range: Rätikon, Alps

The Schwarzhorn is a mountain on the border of Switzerland and Liechtenstein in the Rätikon range of the Eastern Alps. With a height of 2,573 metres (8,442 ft) or 2,574 metres (8,445 ft) above sea level, it is the second highest summit in Liechtenstein.

Sometimes the mountain is listed as Hinter-Grauspitz, but according to reference book "Die Orts- und Flurnamen des Fürstentums Liechtenstein", these are two different mountain peaks.
