= Rauher Berg =

Mountain in Austria and Liechtenstein

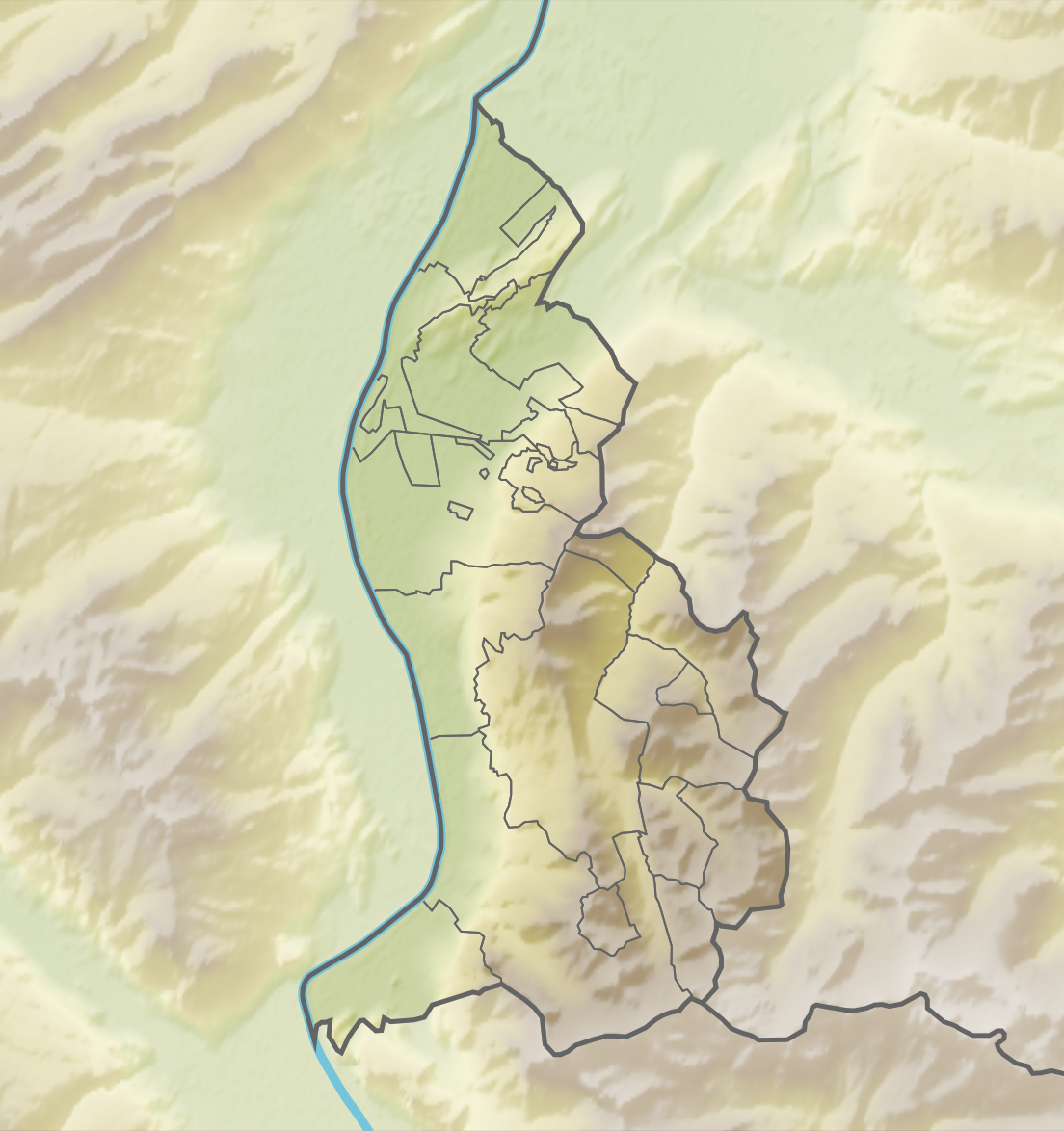
- Location within Liechtenstein

Highest point
- Elevation: 2,094 m (6,870 ft)
- Coordinates: 47°06′27″N 9°37′42″E

Geography
- Location: Liechtenstein / Austria
- Parent range: Rätikon, Alps

Rauher Berg is a mountain on the border of Liechtenstein and Austria in the Rätikon range of the Eastern Alps close to the town of Malbun, with a height of 2,094 metres (6,870 ft).
