= Stachlerkopf =

Mountain in Liechtenstein

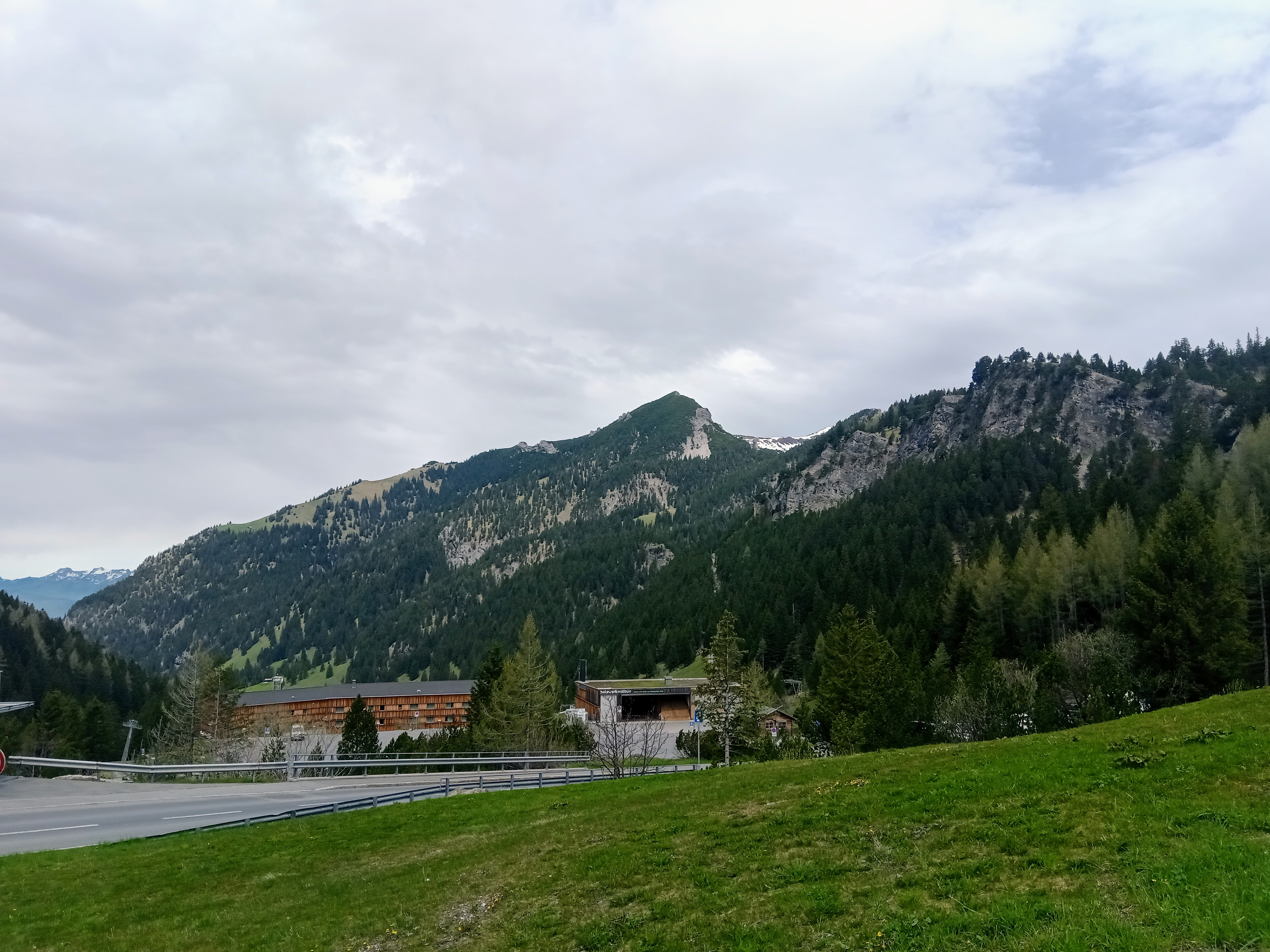

Highest point
- Elevation: 2,071 m (6,795 ft)
- Coordinates: 47°07′18.6″N 9°35′32.5″E

Geography
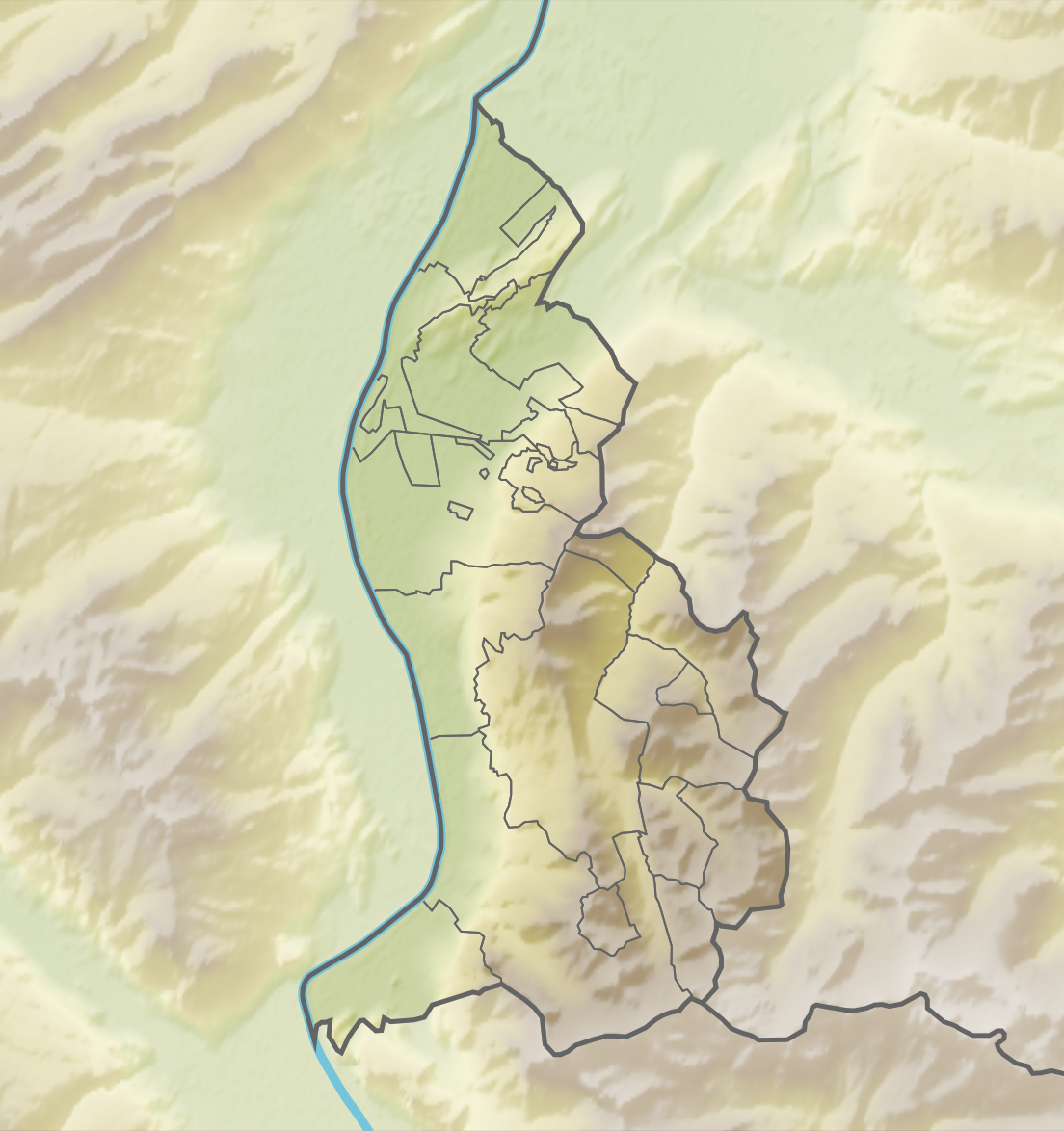
- Location within Liechtenstein
- Location: Liechtenstein
- Parent range: Rätikon, Alps

Stachlerkopf is a mountain in Liechtenstein in the Rätikon range of the Eastern Alps, close to the towns of Steg and Malbun, with a height of 2,071 metres (6,795 ft).
