= Drei Kapuziner =

Mountain in Liechtenstein

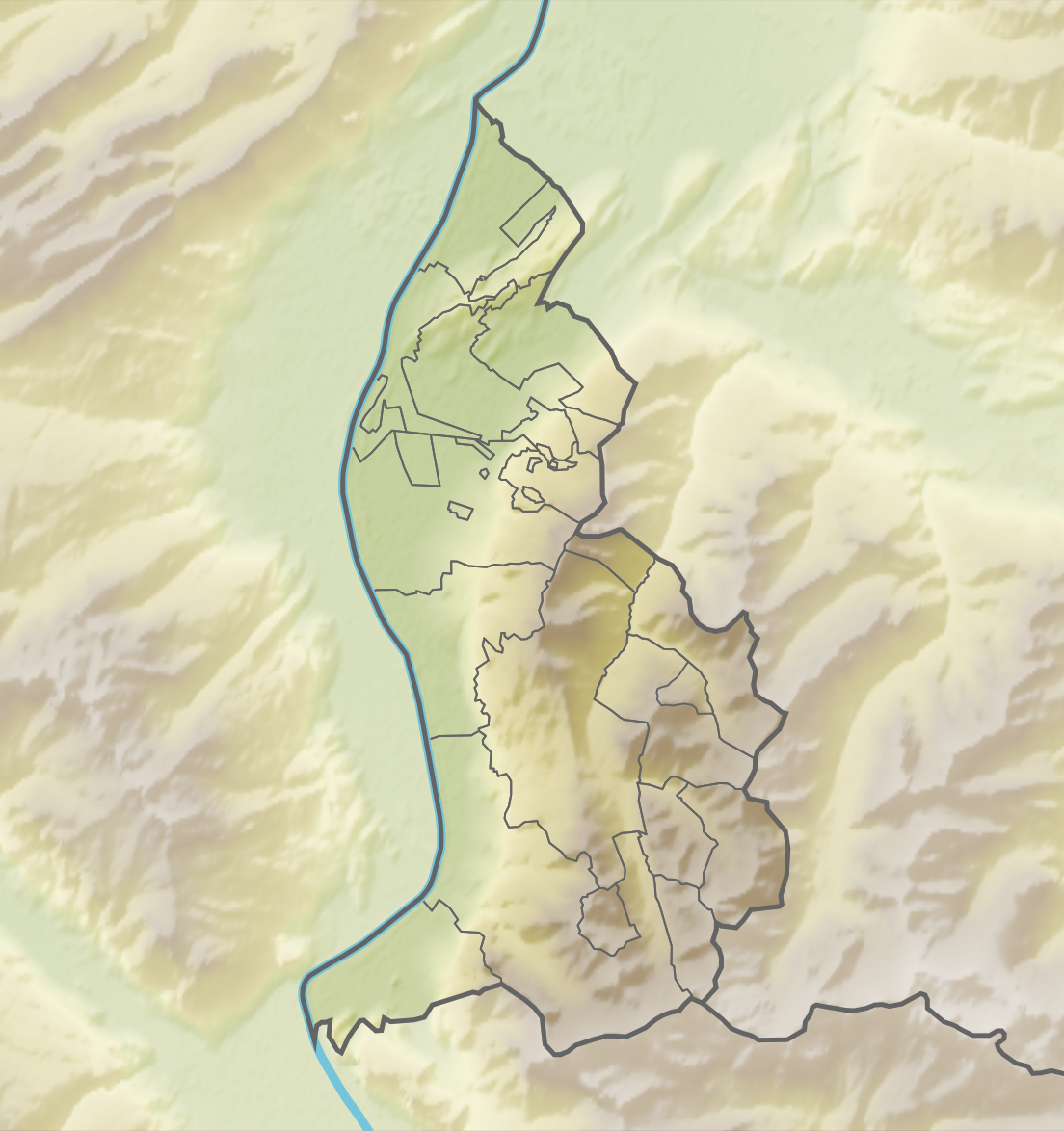
- Location within Liechtenstein

Highest point
- Elevation: 2,084 m (6,837 ft)
- Coordinates: 47°07′27.9″N 9°35′20″E

Geography
- Location: Liechtenstein
- Parent range: Rätikon, Alps

Drei Kapuziner is a mountain in Liechtenstein in the Rätikon range of the Eastern Alps, close to the towns of Malbun and Steg, with a height of 2,084 metres (6,837 ft).

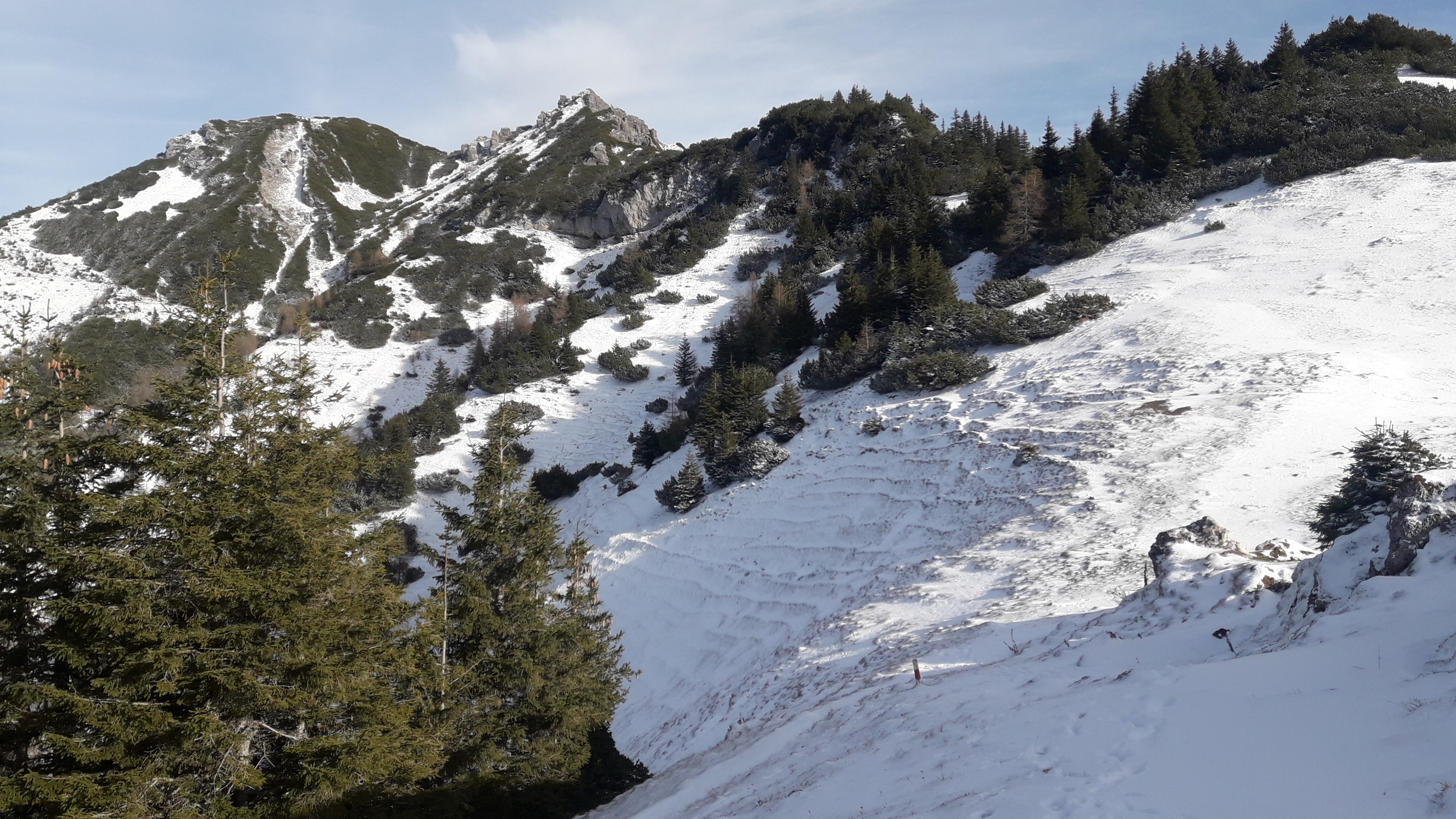
Drei Kapuziner - north west view
