= Ochsenkopf (Malbun) =

Mountain on the border of Liechtenstein and Austria

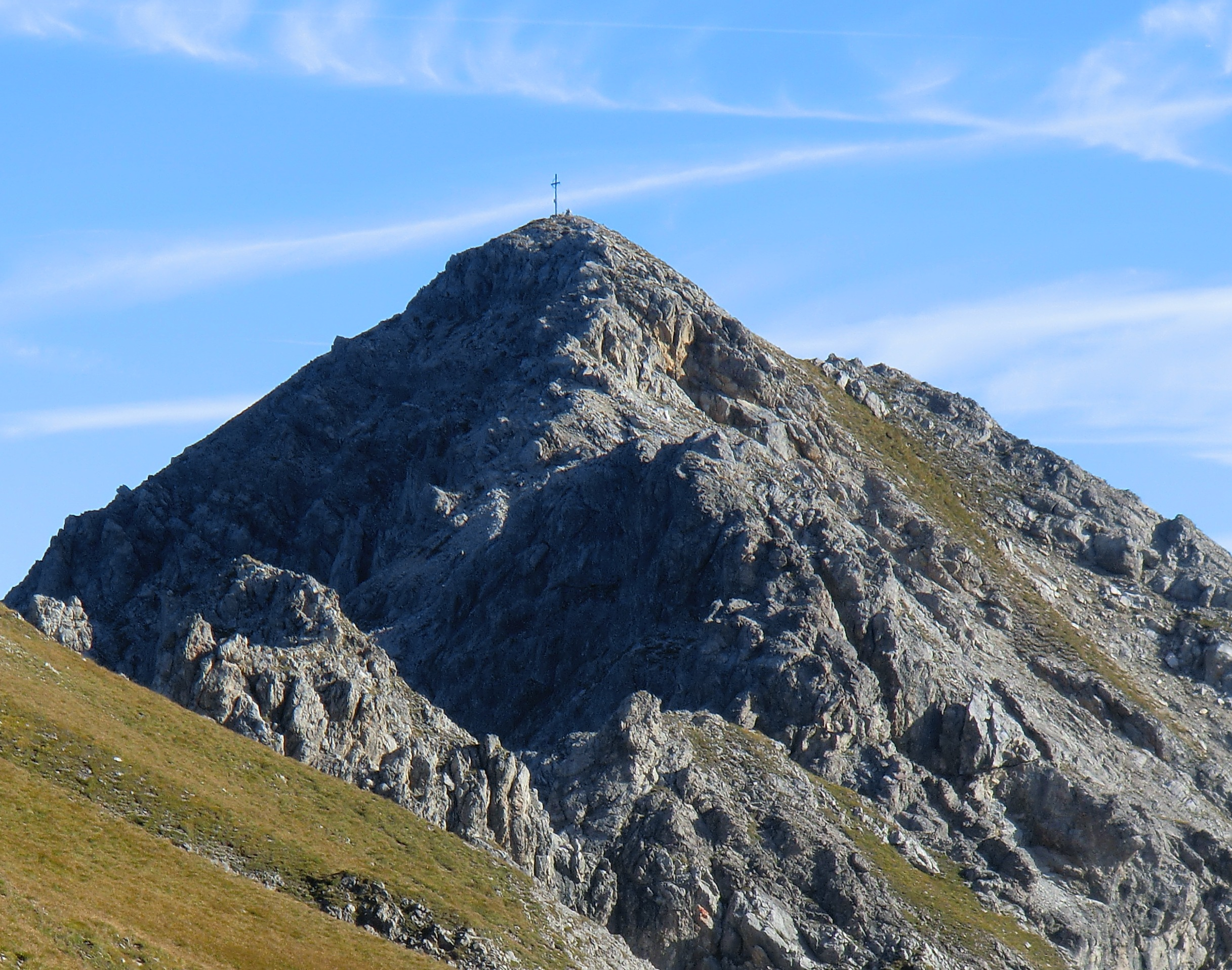

Highest point
- Elevation: 2,286 m (7,500 ft)
- Prominence: 331 m (1,086 ft)
- Coordinates: 47°06′53″N 9°37′28″E

Geography
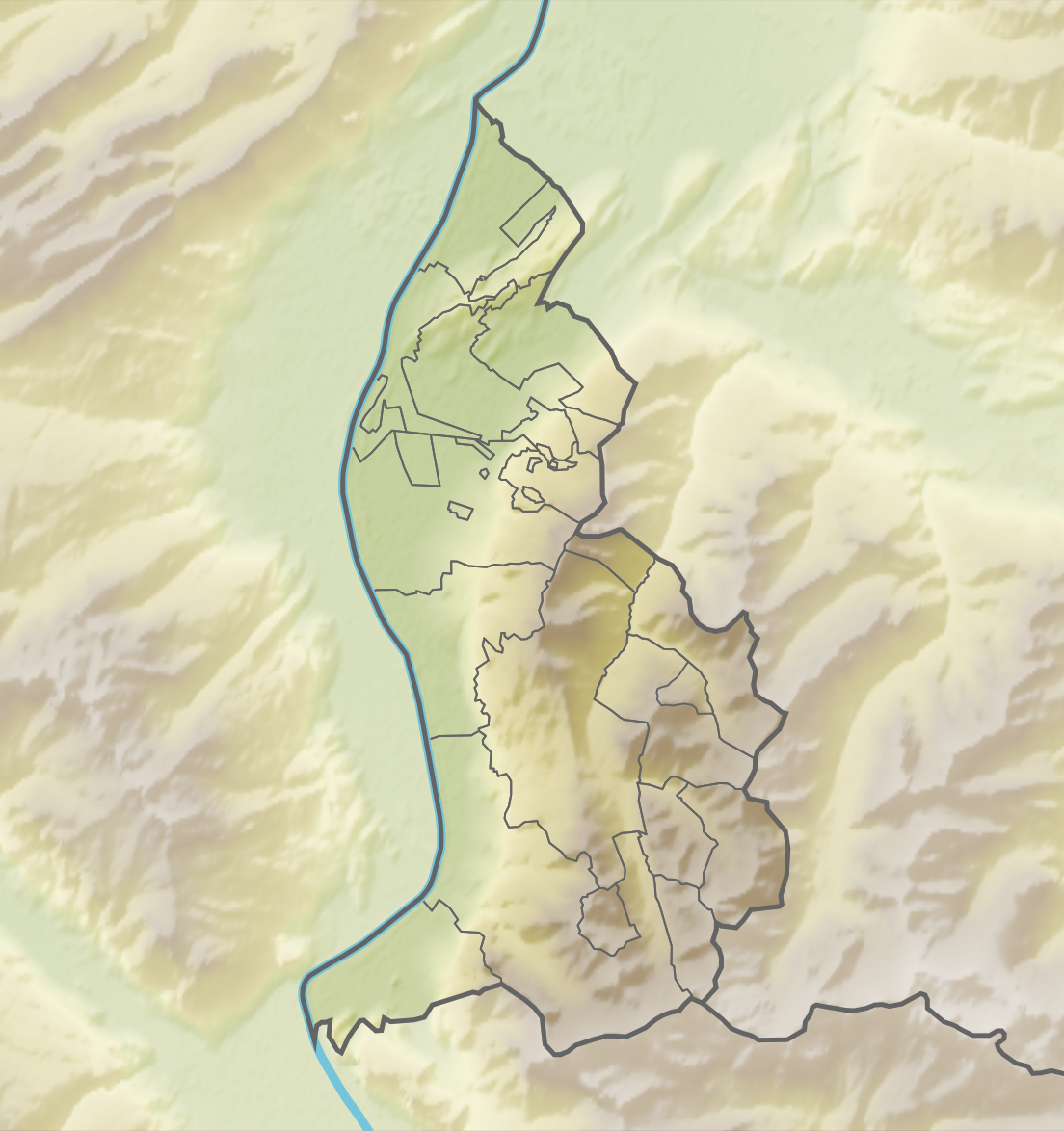
- Location within Liechtenstein
- Location: Liechtenstein / Austria
- Parent range: Rätikon, Alps

Ochsenkopf (German pronunciation: [ˈɔksn̩ˌkɔpf]) is a mountain on the border of Liechtenstein and Austria in the Rätikon range of the Eastern Alps close to the town of Malbun, with a height of 2,286 metres (7,500 ft).
