= Sattelköpfle =

Mountain on the border of Austria and Liechtenstein

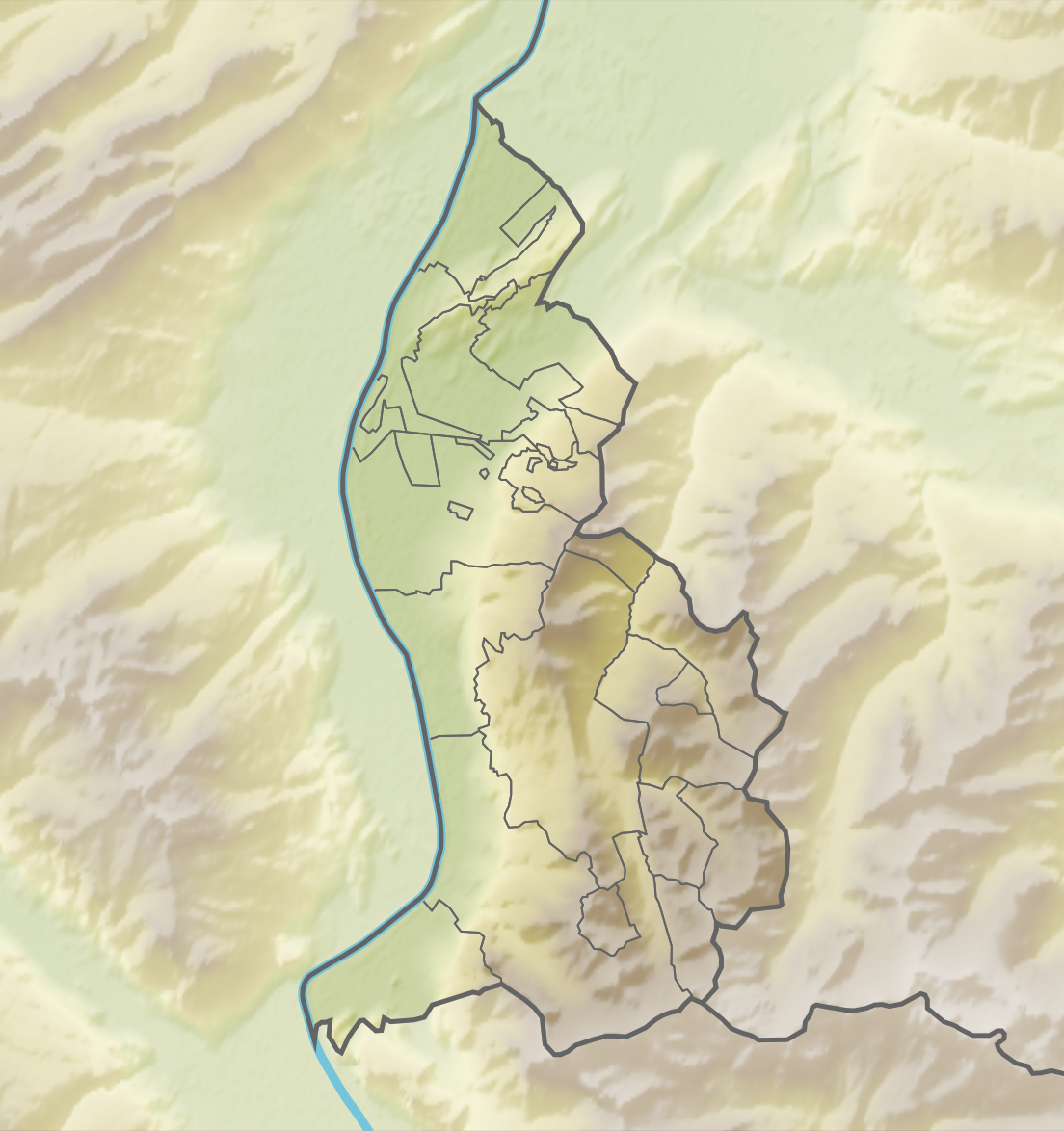
- Location within Liechtenstein

Highest point
- Elevation: 1,688 m (5,538 ft)
- Coordinates: 47°11′08.3″N 9°34′23.7″E

Geography
- Location: Liechtenstein / Austria
- Parent range: Rätikon, Alps

Sattelköpfle is a mountain in on the border of Liechtenstein and Austria in the Rätikon range of the Eastern Alps to the east of the village of Planken, with a height of 1,688 metres (5,538 ft).
