= Goldlochspitz =

Mountain in Liechtenstein

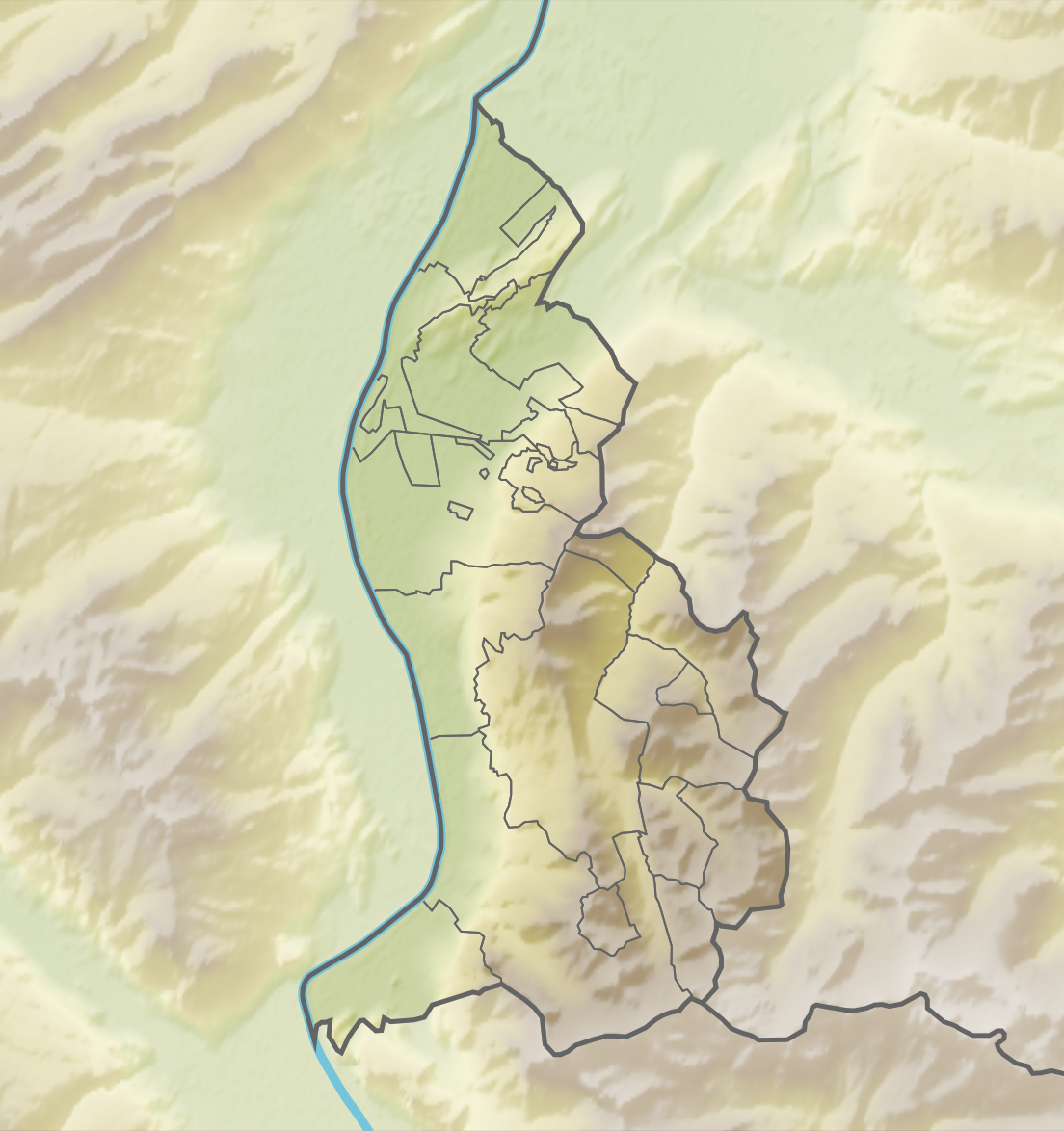
- Location within Liechtenstein

Highest point
- Elevation: 2,110 m (6,920 ft)
- Coordinates: 47°4′53″N 9°34′2″E

Geography
- Location: Liechtenstein
- Parent range: Rätikon, Alps

Goldlochspitz is a mountain in Liechtenstein in the Rätikon range of the Eastern Alps with a height of 2,110 metres (6,920 ft).
