= Heubühl =

Mountain in Liechtenstein

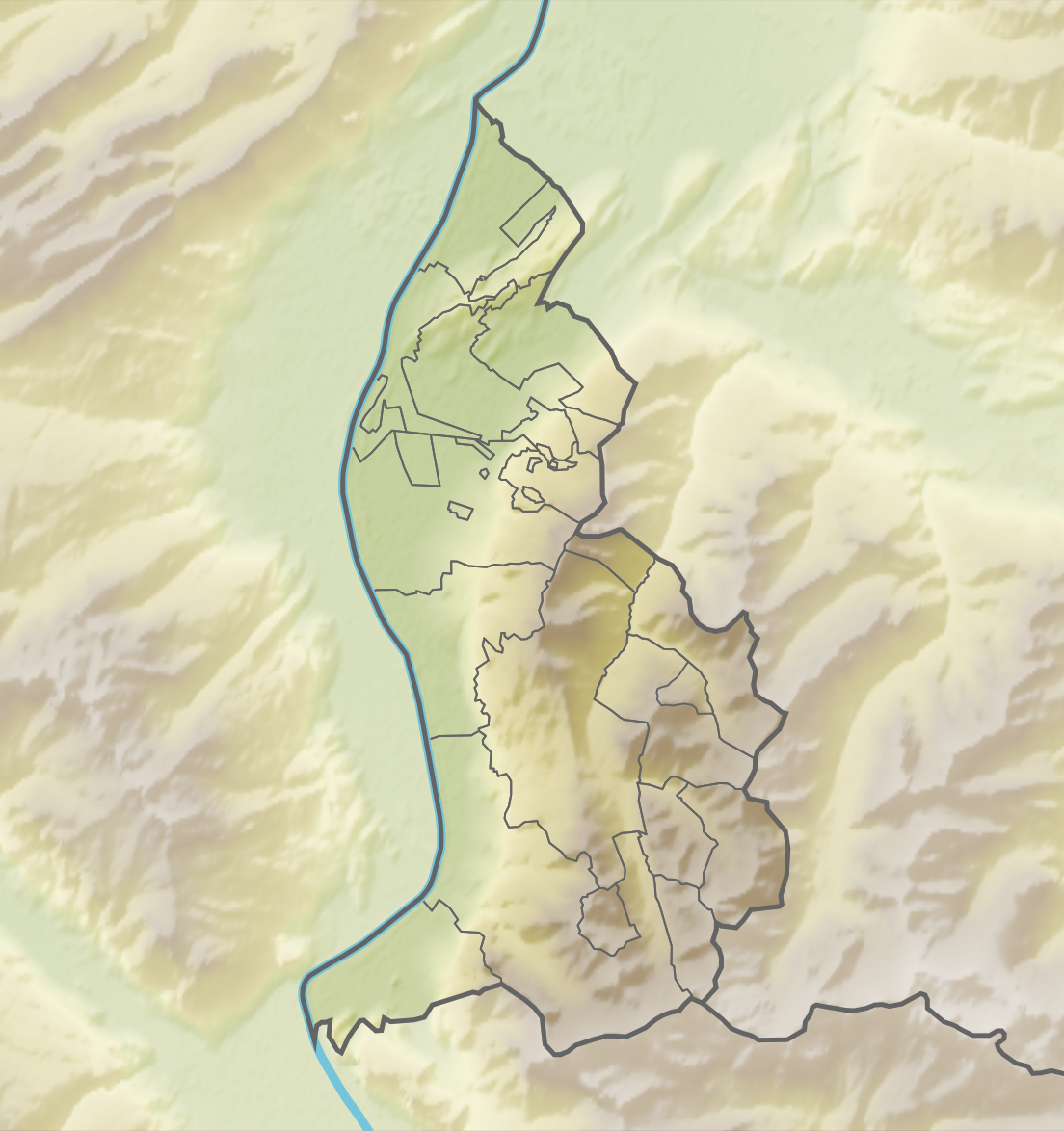
- Location within Liechtenstein

Highest point
- Elevation: 1,936 m (6,352 ft)
- Coordinates: 47°05′46″N 9°34′00.9″E

Geography
- Location: Liechtenstein
- Parent range: Rätikon, Alps

Heubühl is a mountain in Liechtenstein in the Rätikon range of the Eastern Alps, to the east of the town of Triesen, with a height of 1,936 metres (6,352 ft).
