= Kulmi =

Mountain in Liechtenstein

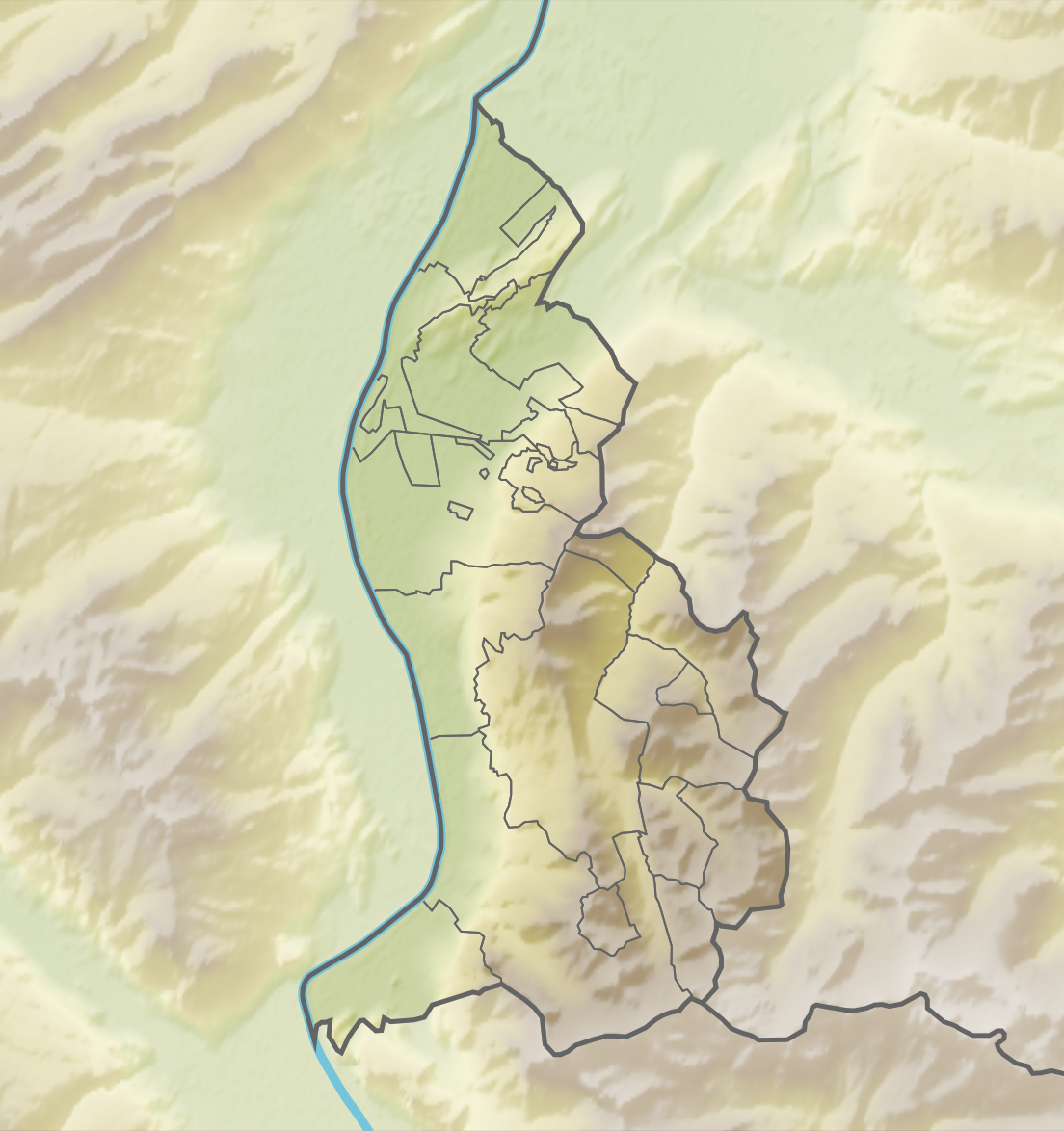
- Location within Liechtenstein

Highest point
- Elevation: 1,993 m (6,539 ft)
- Coordinates: 47°5′15″N 9°34′20″E

Geography
- Location: Liechtenstein
- Parent range: Rätikon, Alps

Kulmi (or Kolme) is a mountain in Liechtenstein in the Rätikon range of the Eastern Alps with a height of 1,993 metres (6,539 ft).
