= Langspitz =

Mountain in Liechtenstein

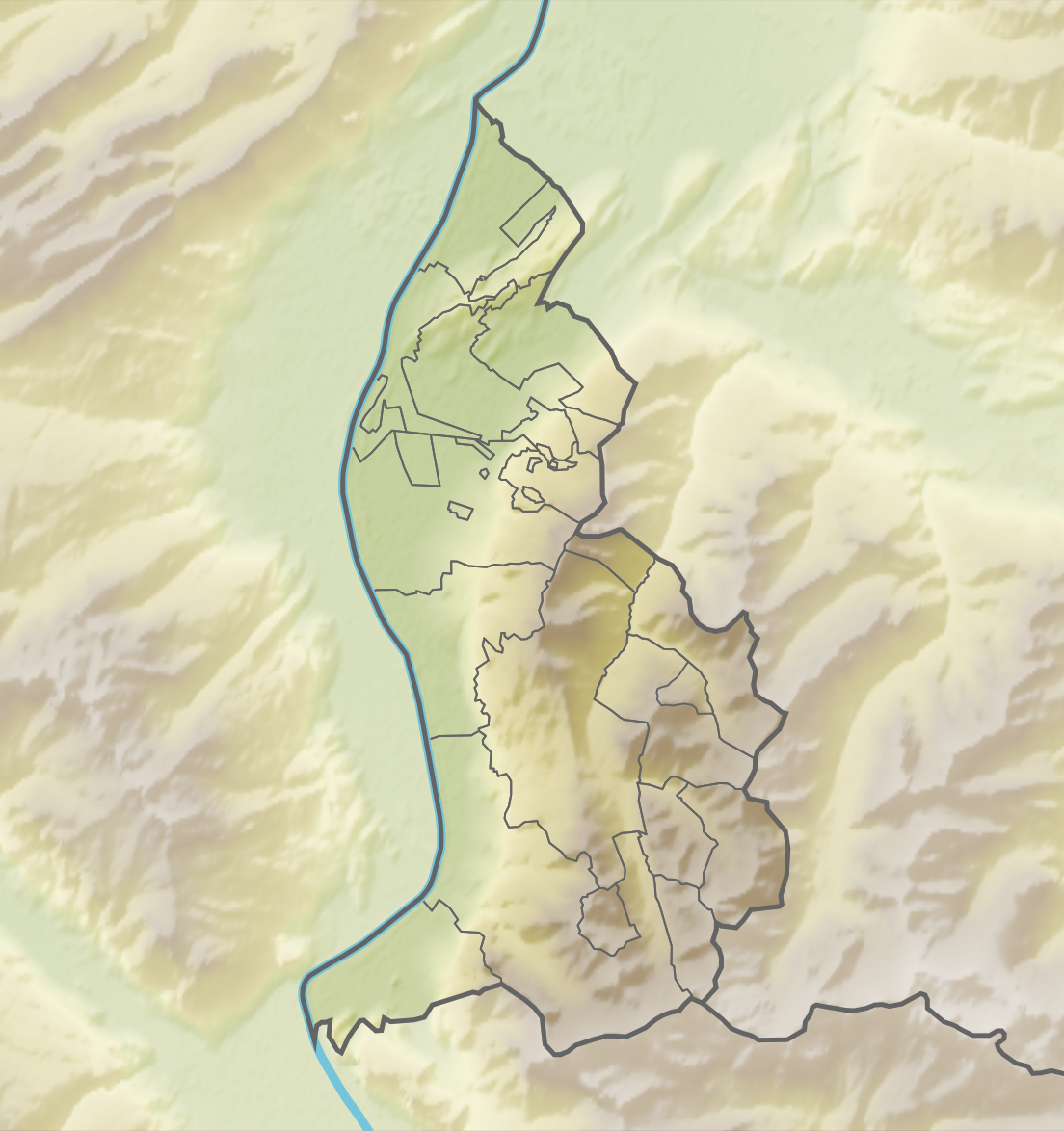
- Location within Liechtenstein

Highest point
- Elevation: 2,006 m (6,581 ft)
- Coordinates: 47°04′43.7″N 9°33′43.1″E

Geography
- Location: Liechtenstein
- Parent range: Rätikon, Alps

Langspitz is a mountain in Liechtenstein in the Rätikon range of the Eastern Alps with a height of 2,006 metres (6,581 ft).
