= Helwangspitz =

Mountain in Liechtenstein

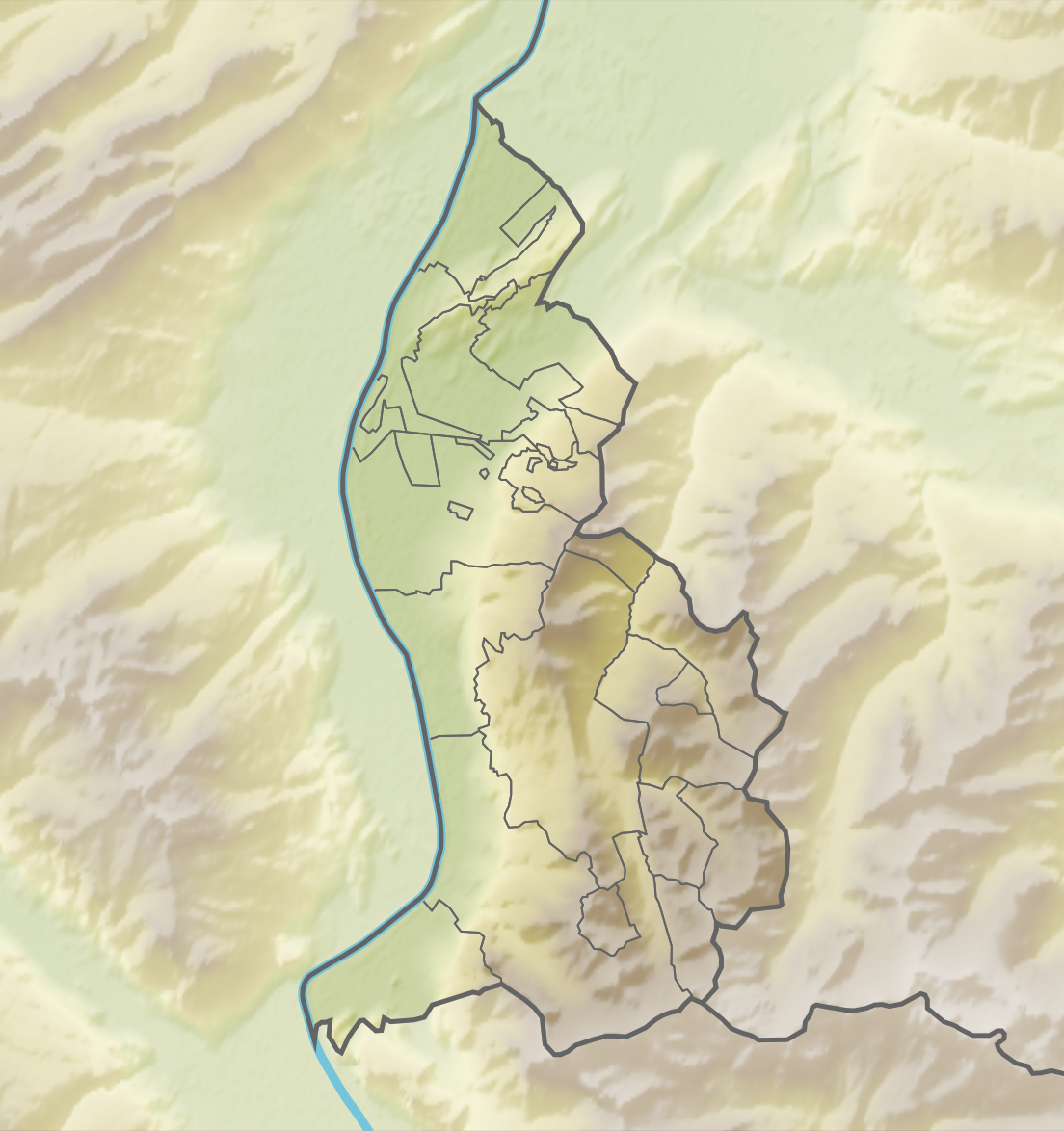
- Location within Liechtenstein

Highest point
- Elevation: 1,999 m (6,558 ft)
- Coordinates: 47°08′55″N 9°33′44″E

Geography
- Location: Liechtenstein
- Parent range: Rätikon, Alps

Helwangspitz is a mountain in Liechtenstein in the Rätikon range of the Eastern Alps, to the east of Vaduz, with a height of 1,999 metres (6,558 ft) / or 2,000 metres (6,600 ft).
