= Augstenberg (Liechtenstein) =

Mountain in Liechtenstein

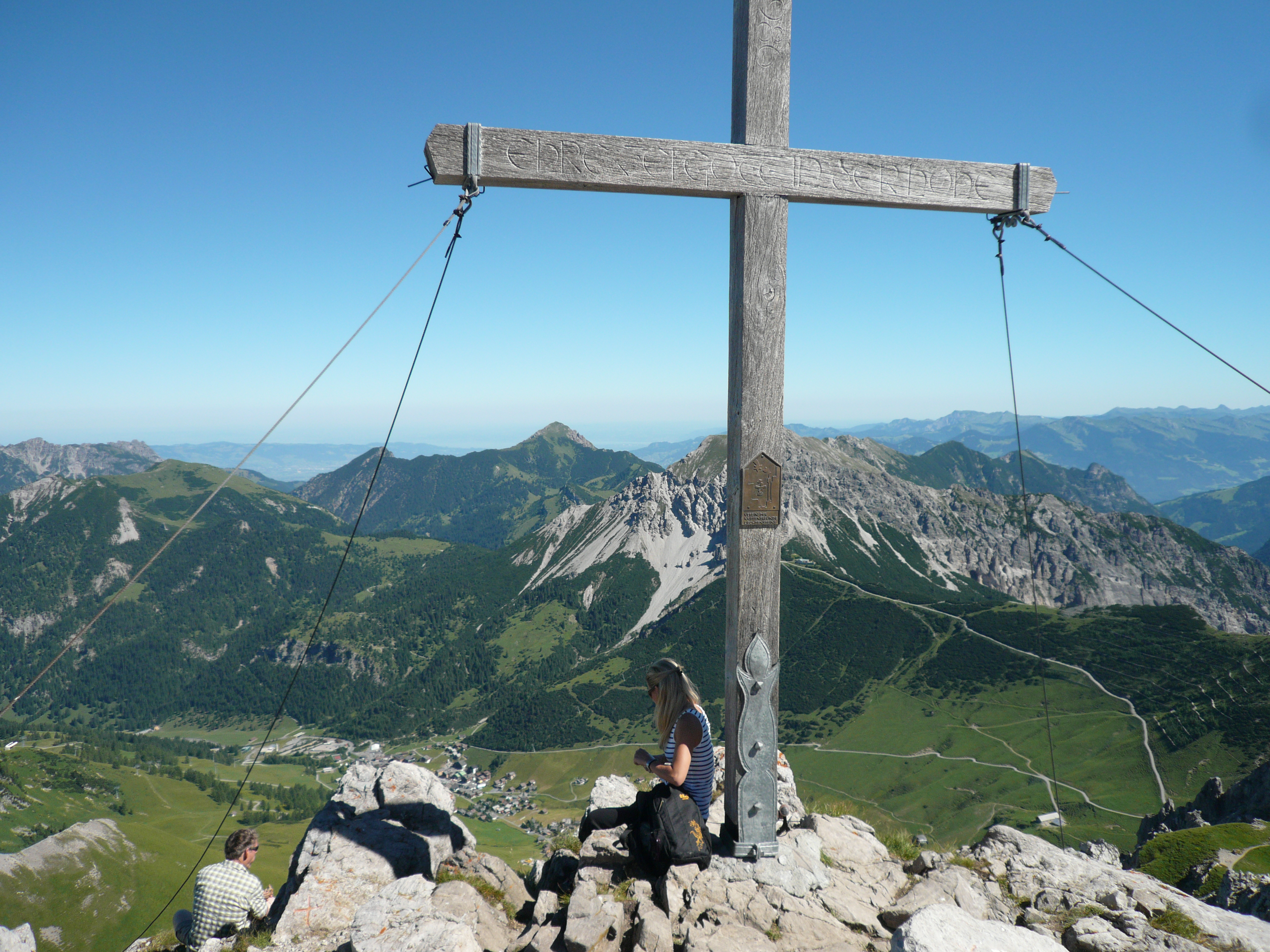
- The summit of Augstenberg

Highest point
- Elevation: 2,359 m (7,740 ft)
- Coordinates: 47°4′57″N 9°36′36″E

Geography
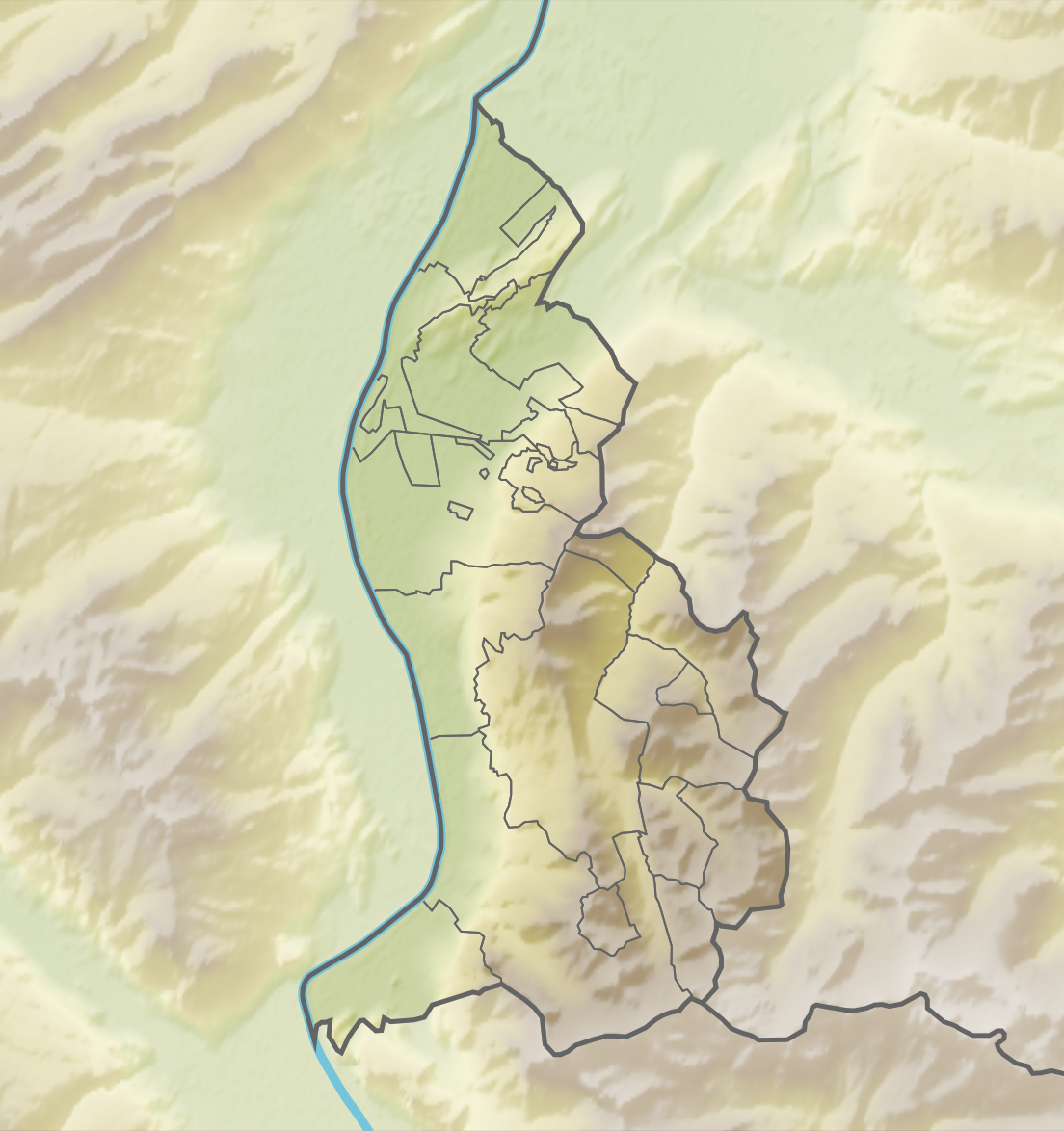
- Location within Liechtenstein
- Location: Liechtenstein
- Parent range: Rätikon, Alps

Augstenberg is a mountain in Liechtenstein in the Rätikon range of the Eastern Alps close to the border with Austria and the town of Malbun, with a height of 2,365 metres (7,759 ft).
