= Eastern Alps =

Eastern part of the Alps mountain range

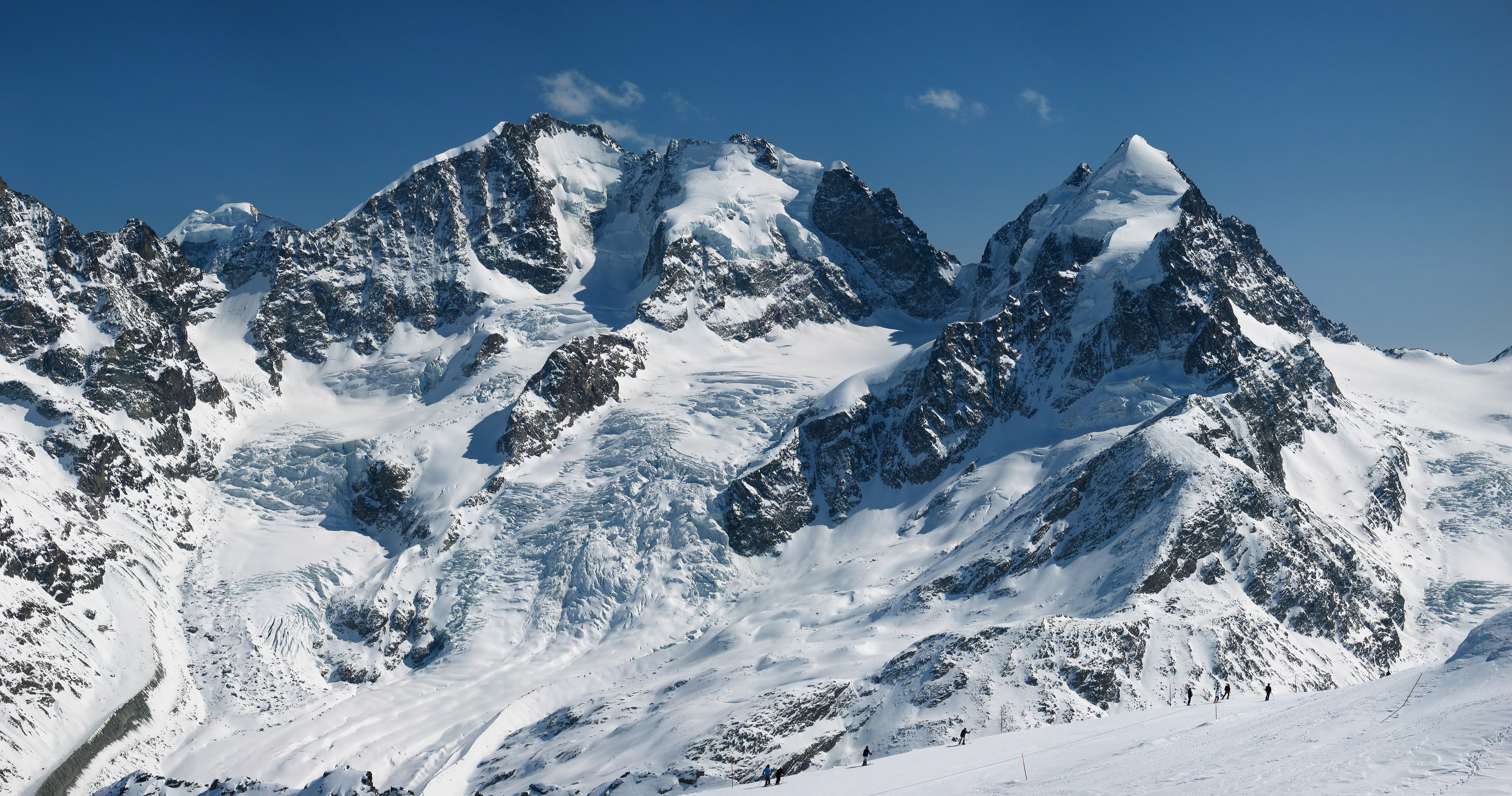
- Piz Bernina (centre-left) with the Biancograt to the left, Piz Scerscen (centre-right) and Piz Roseg (right), seen from Piz Corvatsch

Highest point
- Peak: Piz Bernina
- Elevation: 4,049 m (13,284 ft)
- Coordinates: 46°22′56.6″N 9°54′29.2″E

Dimensions
- Area: 130,000 km^{2} (50,000 mi^{2})

Geography
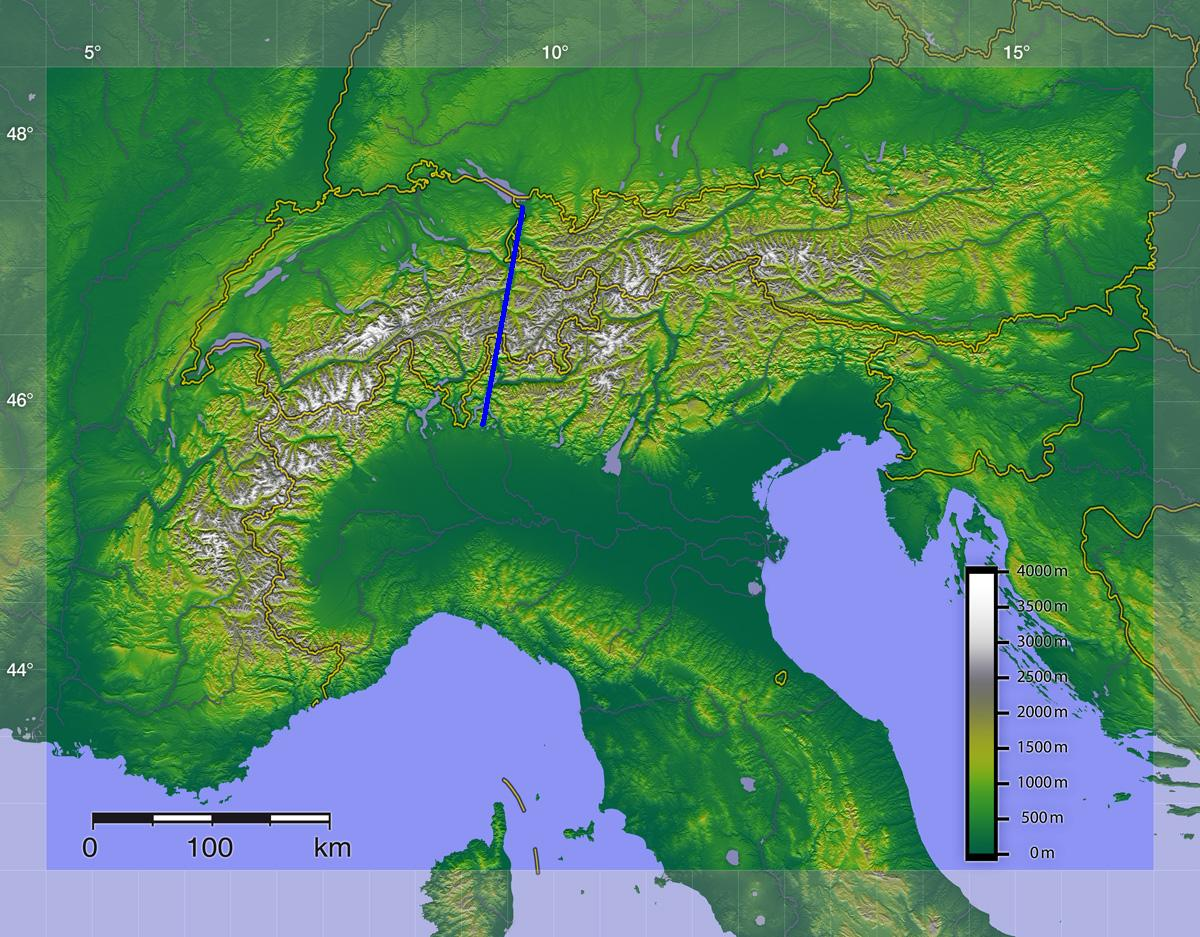
- Delimitation of Western and Eastern Alps
- Countries: Switzerland; Austria; Liechtenstein; Germany; Italy; Slovenia
- Range coordinates: 46°34.5′N 12°13.9′E
- Parent range: Alps
- Borders on: Wienerwald; Transdanubian hills; Dinaric Alps; Venetian Plain; Po plain; Western Alps

Geology
- Orogeny: Alpine orogeny

The Eastern Alps are usually defined as the area east of a line from Lake Constance and the Alpine Rhine valley, up to the Splügen Pass at the Alpine divide, and down the Liro River to Lake Como in the south. The peaks and mountain passes are lower than the Western Alps, while the range itself is broader and less arched.

== Geography ==
=== Overview ===
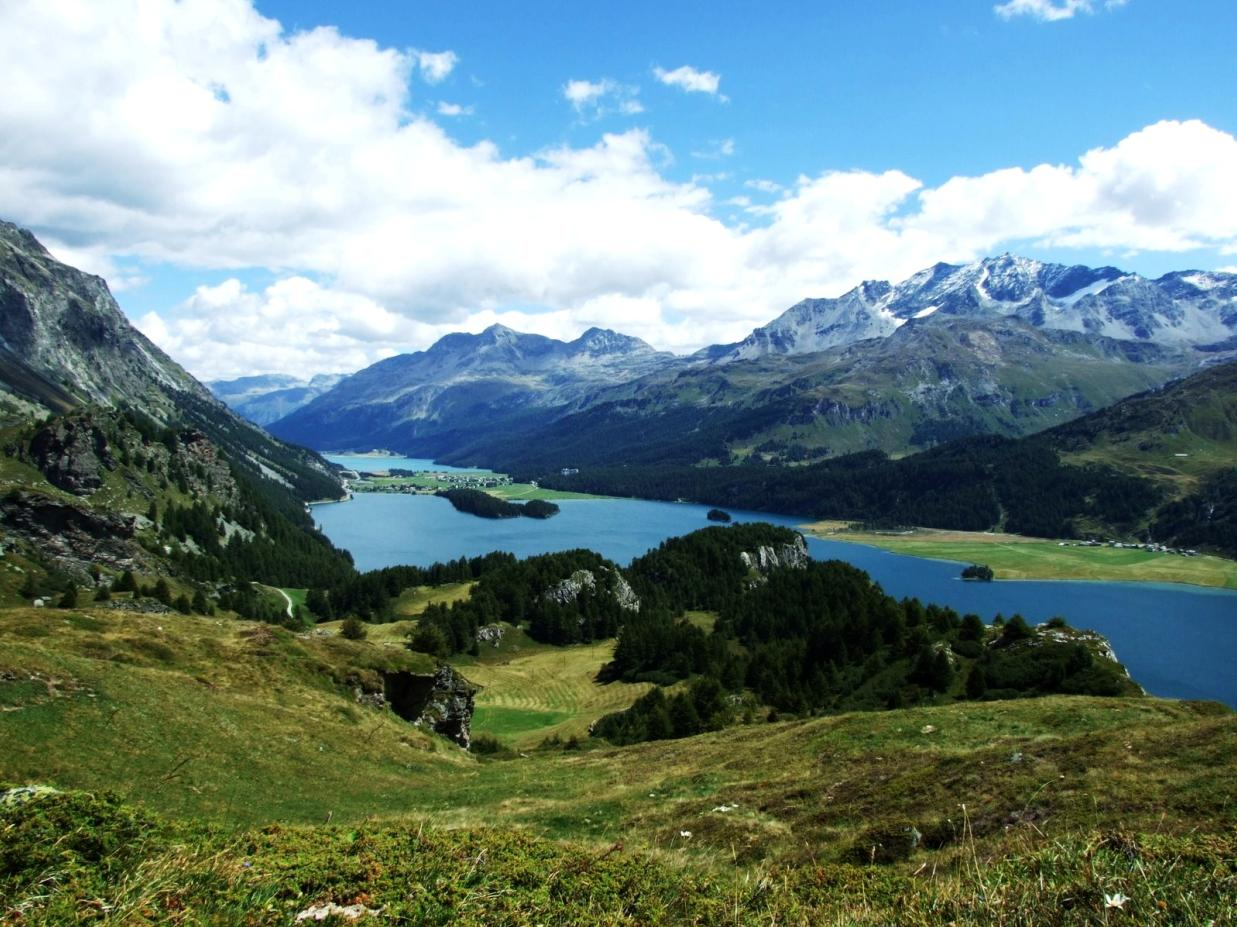
The Upper Engadin valley near St Moritz.

The Eastern Alps include the eastern parts of Switzerland (mainly Graubünden), all of Liechtenstein, and most of Austria from Vorarlberg to the east, as well as parts of extreme Southern Germany (Upper Bavaria), northwestern Italy (Lombardy), northeastern Italy (Trentino-Alto Adige/Südtirol, Veneto and Friuli-Venezia Giulia) and a good portion of northern Slovenia (Upper Carniola and Lower Styria). In the south the range is bound by the Italian Padan Plain; in the north the valley of the Danube River separates it from the Bohemian Massif. The easternmost spur is formed by the Vienna Woods range, with the Leopoldsberg overlooking the Danube and the Vienna Basin, which is the transition zone to the arch of the Carpathian Mountains. The northern portion forms the limestone Berchtesgaden Alps.

=== Mountains ===
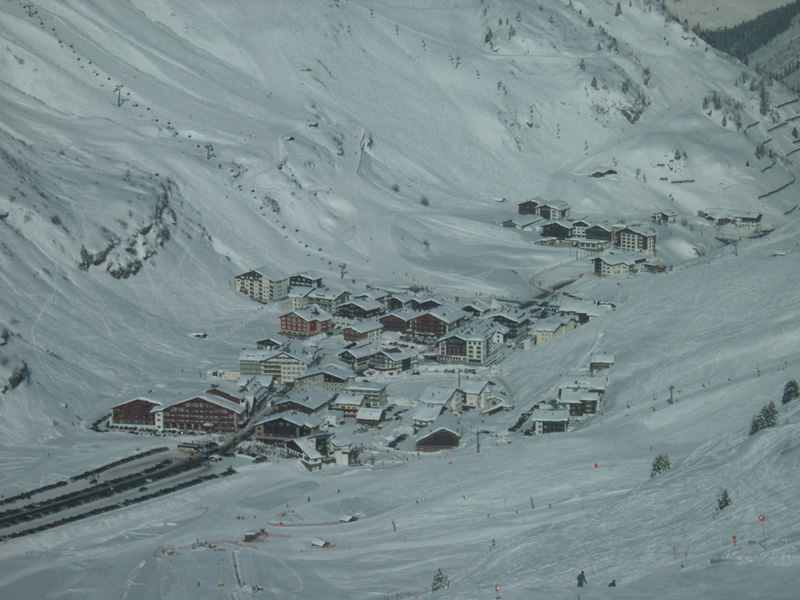
Zuers at the Flexenpass in Vorarlberg.

The highest mountain in the Eastern Alps is Piz Bernina at 4,049 m (13,284 ft) in the Bernina Group of the Western Rhaetian Alps in Switzerland. The sole four-thousander of the range, its name is taken from the Bernina Pass and was given in 1850 by Johann Coaz, who also made the first ascent. The rocks composing Piz Bernina are diorites and gabbros, while the massif in general is composed of granites (Piz Corvatsch, Piz Palü).

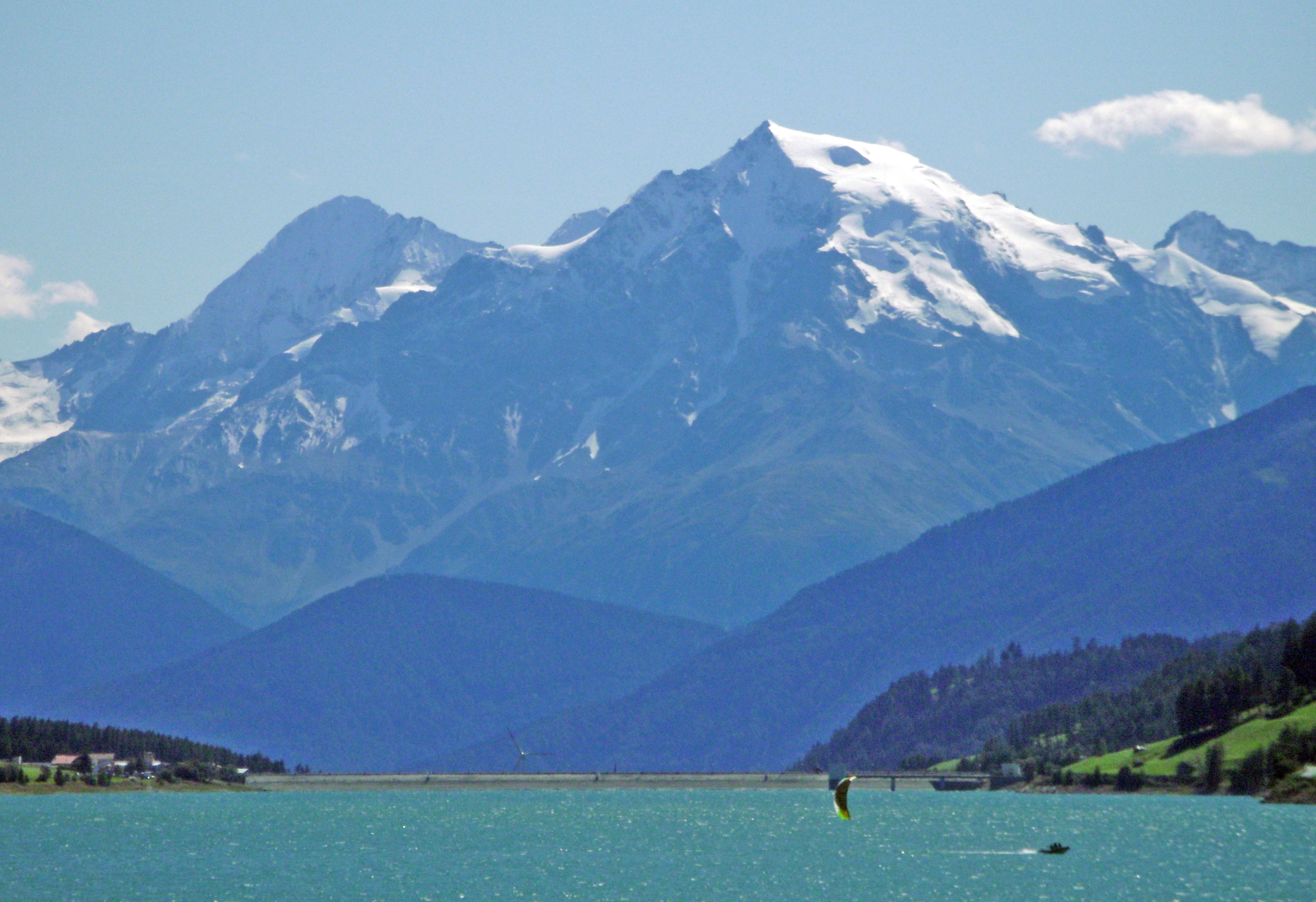
left summit: the Königspitze, right summit: the Ortler; seen from Lake Reschen.

Excepting other peaks in the Bernina range, the next highest is the Ortler at 3,905 m (12,812 ft) in Italian South Tyrol and third the Großglockner, which stands on the border of Carinthia & East Tyrol in Austria, at 3,798 m (12,461 ft), the highest mountain of Austria. The region around the Großglockner and the adjacent Pasterze Glacier has been a special protection area within the High Tauern National Park since 1986. Other high Tyrolian mountains include Königspitze (3,851 m), Monte Cevedale (3,769 m), and Wildspitze (3,768 m).

Crossing Tyrol, on the border between North and South Tyrol, runs the main chain of the Alps.

The city of Innsbruck is in the broad valley between high mountains of the so-called North Chain in the Karwendel Alps (Hafelekarspitze, 2,334 metres or 7,657 feet) to the north and Patscherkofel (2,246 m or 7,369 ft) and Serles (2,718 m or 8,917 ft) to the south. The name "Innsbruck" means 'bridge over the Inn'.

Vorarlberg's notable mountain ranges include the Silvretta, the Rätikon, the Verwall and the Arlberg. The highest mountain is the Piz Buin, whose rocky peak of 3,312 m (10,866 ft). The Silvretta Alps cut across Tirol and Vorarlberg (both in Austria), and Graubünden (Switzerland).

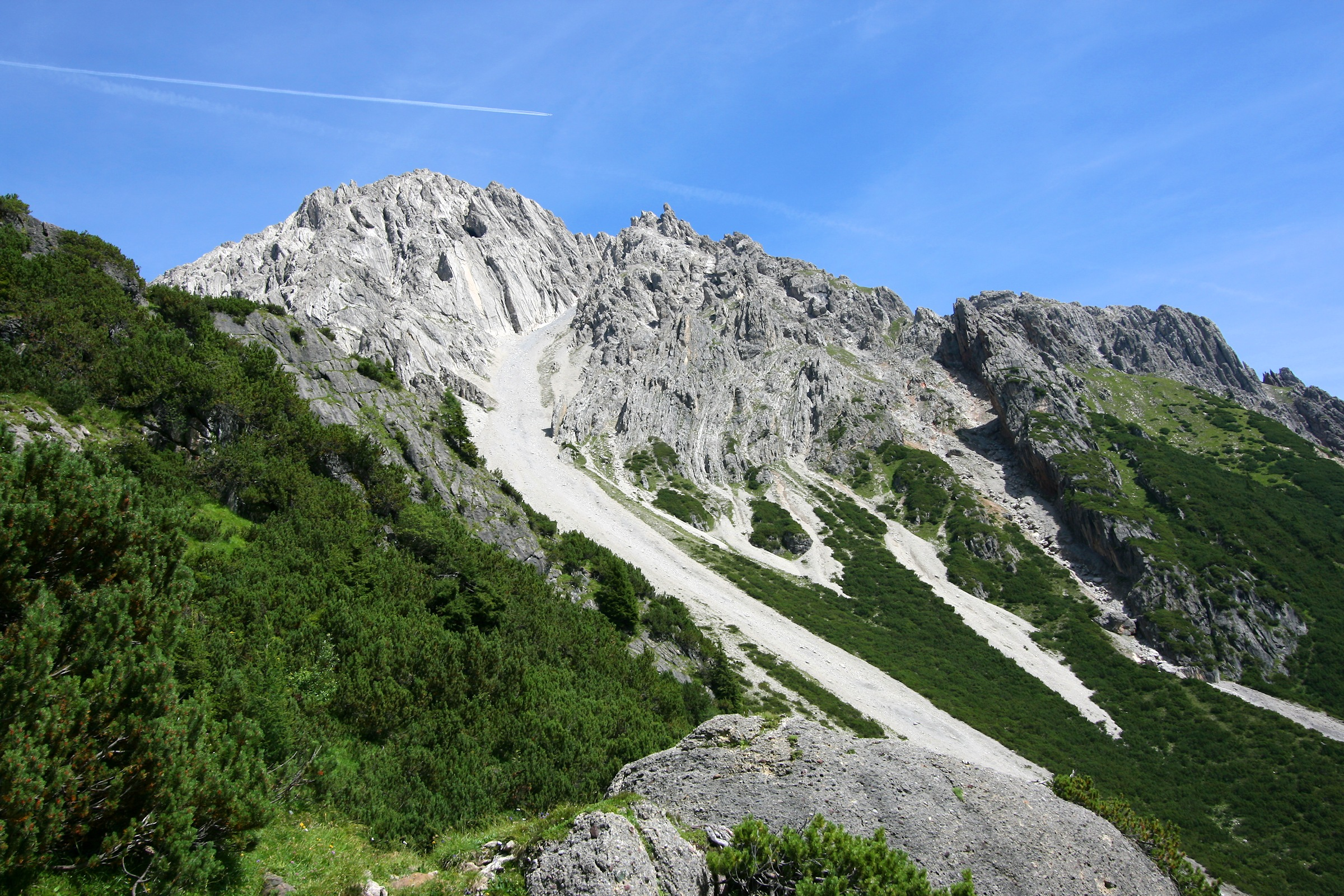
Platteinspitze in Lechtal Alps.

The Sulzfluh is well frequented by climbers and is situated in the Rätikon range of the Alps, on the border between Austria and Switzerland. On the eastern side is a mountain path, of grade T4, allowing non-climbers to reach the 2,817 m (9,242 ft) summit. There are six known caves in the limestone mountain, with lengths between 800 and 3000 or more yards, all with entrances on the Eastern side, in Switzerland.

About half of Liechtenstein's territory is mountainous. and the highest point of Liechtenstein is the Grauspitz (Vorder Grauspitze or Vorder Grauspitz on some maps) with an altitude of 2599m above sea level. This is the highest summit of the Rätikon and is located on the border between Liechtenstein and Switzerland.

The Falknishorn, at 2,452 m (8,045 ft) above sea level, is the 5th highest mountain in Liechtenstein and represents the southernmost point of the country, it is also on the border between Liechtenstein and Switzerland. The area known as the Liechtenstein-Graubünden-Vorarlberg border triangle is around the Naafkopf mountain that reaches 2,570 m (8,430 ft) above sea level.

In addition to the peaks of the Alpine chain, which belong to the Limestone Alps, two inselbergs, Fläscherberg (1135 meters above sea level) in the south and Eschnerberg (698 m) in the north, rise from the Rhine Valley and belong to the Helvetic cover or flysch zone of the Alps. A sandstone mountain belt called the Flyschzone runs along the Northern Margin of the Limestone Alps and used to be part the submerged sea bed of the Tethys Ocean. The chain also includes the Klippenzone and Steinitzer Wald.

Liechtenstein lies entirely within the Rätikon and is thus allotted either to the Eastern Alps (two-part division of the Alps) or to the Central Alps (three-part division of the Alps) depending on how its geology is classified. The Rätikon mountain range, in the Central Eastern Alps, derives its name from Raetia.

The High Tauern mountain range in which Grossglockner, 3,797 m (12,457.35 ft) lies is on the border between the state of Carinthia and the state of Tyrol (East Tyrol).

The Julian Alps cross the Italian border from Friuli into Slovenia's Municipality of Bovec. The highest mountain is Triglav at 2,864 m (9,396 ft).

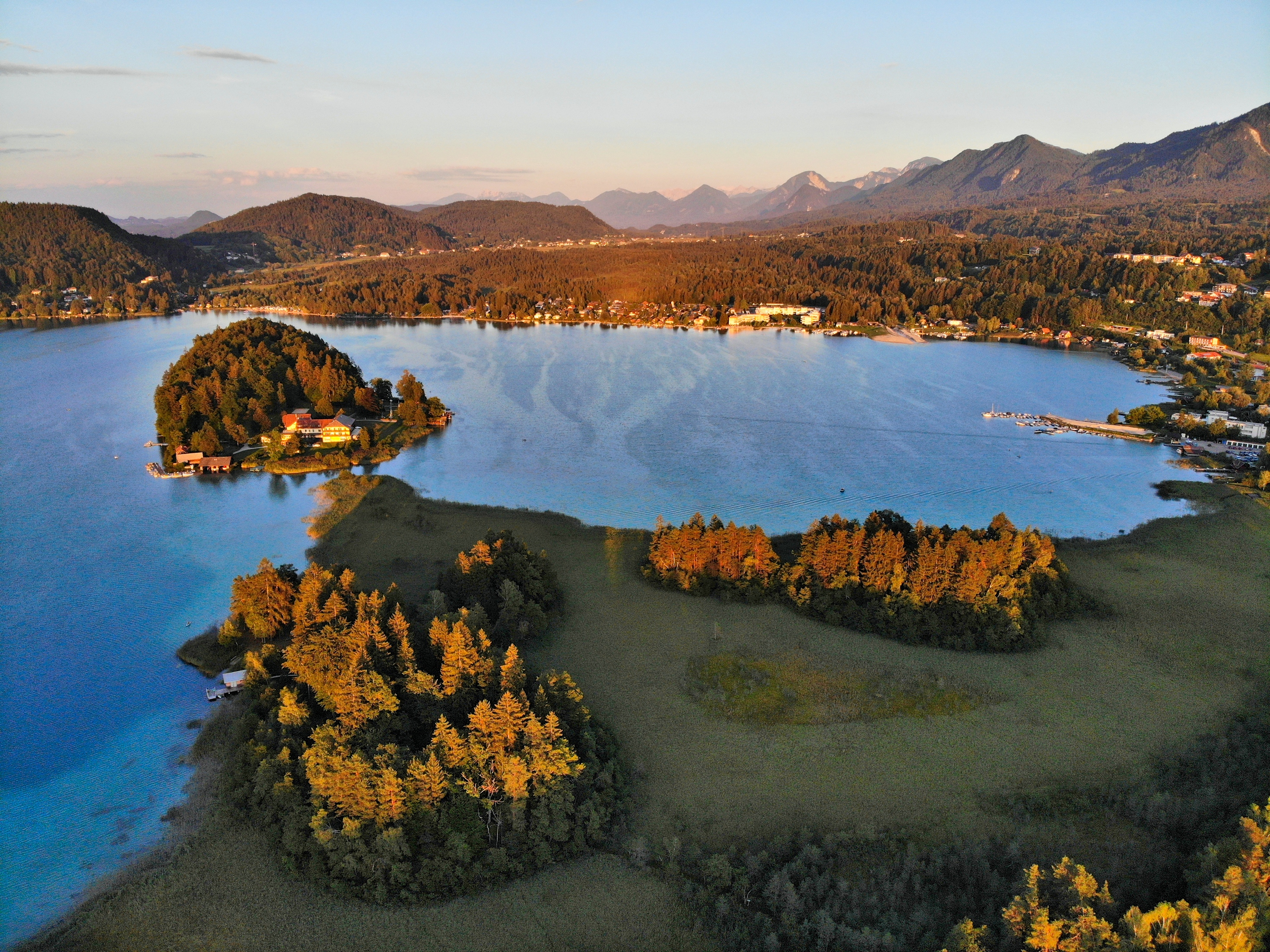
Lake Faak and the Karawanks.

The Karawanks mountain range of the Southern Limestone Alps straddles the border between the Austrian state of Carinthia and the Slovenian Gorenjska. The range contains both the Meža Valley (Mežiška dolina) down to the confluence with the Drava Valley (Dravska dolina) and the Municipality of Jezersko south of the Seeberg Saddle mountain pass, totalling 478 km^{2} (185 mi^{2}) and includes the municipalities of Črna na Koroškem, Mežica, Prevalje and Ravne na Koroškem, and Dravograd.

Austrian and Slovenian Carinthia has a very diverse landscape, with a predominance of hilly and mountainous terrain of Pleistocene origins and was sculpted by former glaciers. Over two thirds of Slovenian Carinthia is covered by forest (largely beech, fir, and spruce) and the amount of forested land is still increasing. The mountains of Peca and Raduha are in the eastern part of the Kamnik–Savinja Alps of northern Slovenia.

The Jenner (German pronunciation: [ˈjɛnɐ]) is a northern Alpine mountain in southern Bavaria, Germany and it is part of the Göll massif within the Berchtesgaden Alps.

=== Rivers ===
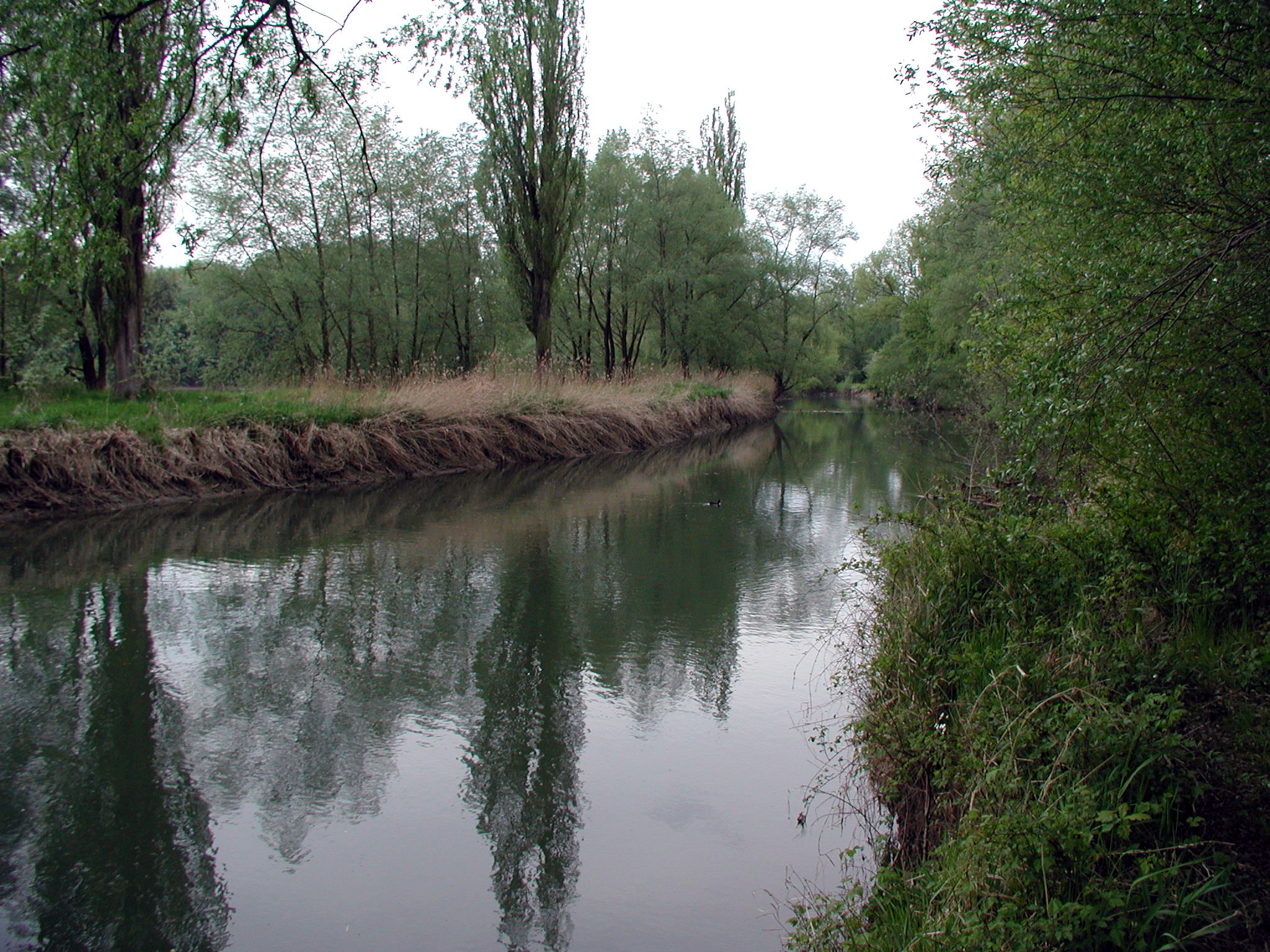
The Old Rhine (Alter Rhein) in Höchst

The Alpine Rhine has as its source the Swiss canton of Grisons, which flows through the Chur Rhine Valley, or Grisonian Rhine Valley (German: Churer Rheintal, or Bündner Rheintal) and Vorarlberg Rhine Valley (German: Voralberger Rheintal). It later forms the border between Switzerland to the west and Liechtenstein and later Austria to the east.

The Mur (German pronunciation: [ˈmuːɐ̯]) or Mura (Slovene pronunciation: [ˈmúːɾa]; Croatian: [mǔːra]; Hungarian: [ˈmurɒ]; Prekmurje Slovene: Müra or Möra) is a 464 kilometres (288 mi) long river in Central Europe with a drainage basin that covers an area of 14,109 km^{2} (5,448 mi^{2}). It rises in the Hohe Tauern national park of the Central Eastern Alps in Austria with its source being 1,898 m (6,227 ft) above sea level. It is a tributary of the Drava and subsequently the Danube. The major rivers in Tyrol are the Adige, Inn, and Drau (or Drava). The major river in Carinthia is the Drau (or Drava) and the major river in Slovenia is the Sava.

=== National parks and protected places ===
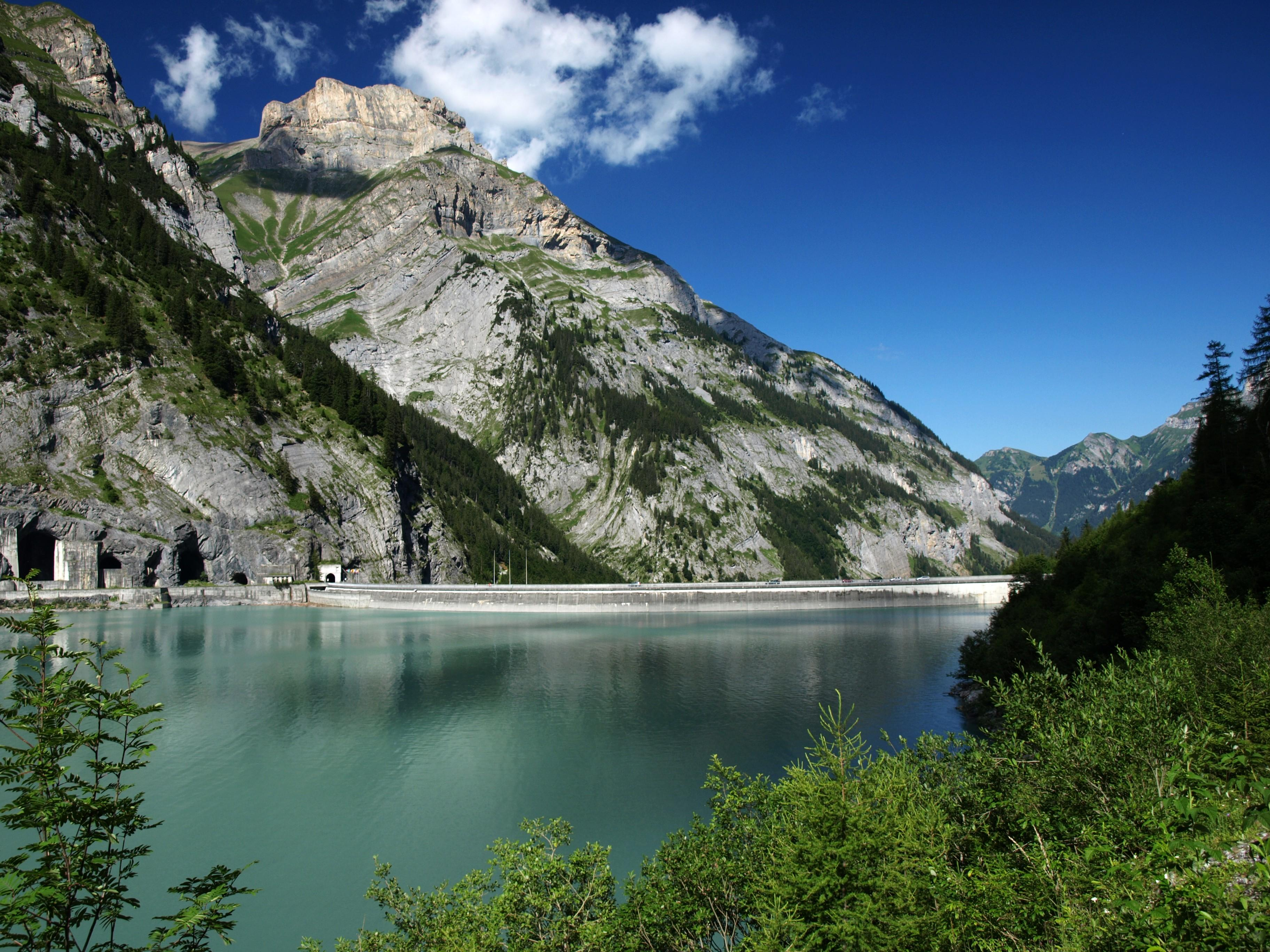
Gigerwaldsee, Calfeisental.

Triglav National Park was founded in 1981. It was originally set out in 1924 on a smaller scale and scrapped between 1944 and 1961.

The mountains of the canton include part of a thrust fault that was declared a geologic UNESCO World Heritage Site, under the name Swiss Tectonic Arena Sardona, in 2008.

The Vienna Woods are a protected piece of upland forestry in Austria.

The Pasterze Glacier a protected piece of mountain glacier in Austria.

== Classification ==
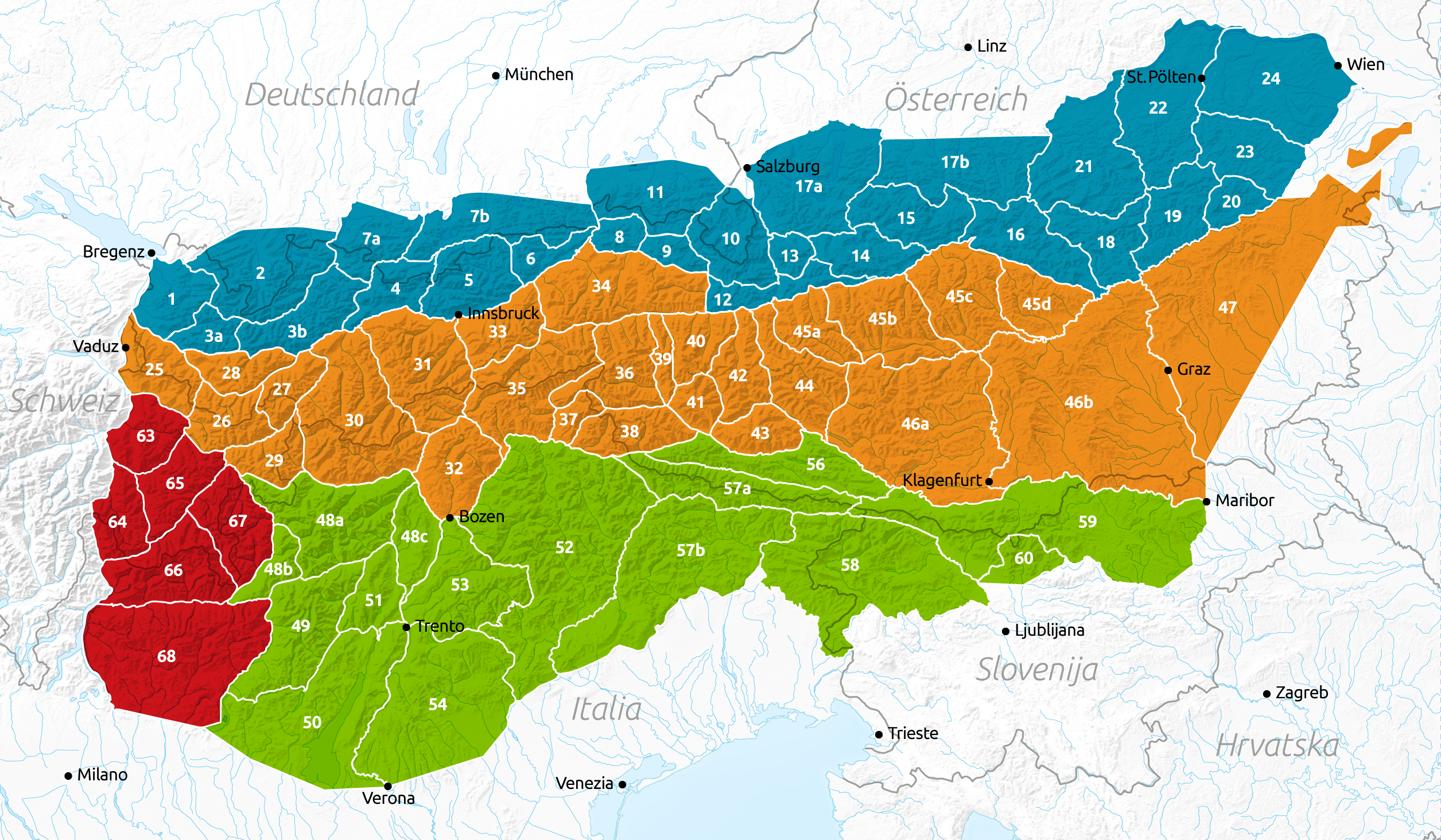
AVE classification of the Eastern Alps: Northern Limestone Alps Central Eastern Alps Southern Limestone Alps Western Limestone Alps For numbering see the list of mountain groups in the Alpine Club classification of the Eastern Alps.

=== Geomorphology ===
The ranges are subdivided by several deeply indented river valleys, mostly running east–west, including the Inn, Salzach, Enns, Adige, Drava, and Mur valleys. According to the traditional Alpine Club classification of the Eastern Alps (AVE) widely used by Austrian and German mountaineers, these mountain chains comprise several dozen smaller mountain groups, each assigned to four larger regions:

- Northern Limestone Alps
- Central Eastern Alps
- Southern Limestone Alps
- Western Limestone Alps

For the breakdown of these regions into mountain groups see the List of mountain groups in the Alpine Club classification of the Eastern Alps. The Swiss Alpine Club (SAC) has a slightly different classification of the ranges, based on the political borders in the canton of Graubünden. In Italy the 1926 Partizione delle Alpi concept is quite common, recently superseded by the SOIUSA attempt to combine the different approaches. Other specific, especially hydrographical arrangements are also in use.

=== Tectonics ===
The Alps comprise four main nappe systems:

- The Helvetic nappes (Helveticum, French: Dauphiné), with their main ranges in the Western Alps. They consist primarily of Cretaceous and Paleogene sedimentary rocks in multiple folds.
- The Penninic nappes (Penninicum), Jurassic sediments of the Tethys Ocean stretching from the Eurasian to the Apulian Plate, pushed together during the Alpine orogeny. They comprise a Flysch zone and several crystalline rocks in geological windows, such as the Engadin window and the Hohe Tauern window in the Central Alps.
- The East Alpine system: the Northern Limestone Alps, made up of Mesozoic (Triassic) rocks, the Paleozoic slate (Kitzbühel and Salzburg Slate Alps) and the greywacke zone, as well as the crystalline Central Eastern Alps, the Precambrian and Paleozoic remnants of a main strike.
- The South Alpine system (Dinaric nappes) south of the Periadriatic Seam (Valtellina—Tonale Pass—Puster Valley—Gailtal—Karawanks). They mainly consist of Mesozoic and Paleozoic formations (Carnic Alps, Karawanks and several smaller strikes) with little faults, whose nappes and folds are oriented towards the south.

== History ==
=== The ice age ===
During the Würm glaciation, the Eastern Alps were drier than the Western Alps, with the contiguous ice shield ending in the region of the Niedere Tauern in Austria. This allowed many species to survive the ice age in the Eastern Alps where they could not survive elsewhere. For that reason, many species of plants are endemic to the Eastern Alps.

=== Ancient history ===
The first signs of humans living in the area of present-day Liechtenstein can be dated back to the Middle Paleolithic era. Neolithic farming settlements appeared in the valleys around 5300 BCE.

A Bronze Age settlement at the site goes back as far as the Pfyn culture (3900–3500 BCE), making Chur one of the oldest settlements in Switzerland. In ancient times, the area of what is today Ticino was settled by the Lepontii, a Celtic tribe. Later, probably around the reign of Augustus, it became part of the Roman Empire.

In ancient times, the region had long been inhabited by the Celts before it became part of the ancient Roman provinces of Raetia and Noricum. There were two Celtic tribes settled in the future Vorarlberg area: the Raeti in the highlands, and the Vindelici in the lowlands, i.e. the Lake Constance region and the Rhine Valley prior to the Romans conquered Vorarlberg area.

Rome conquered the area of the future Municipality of Schellenberg in 15BCE.

=== Classical antiquity ===
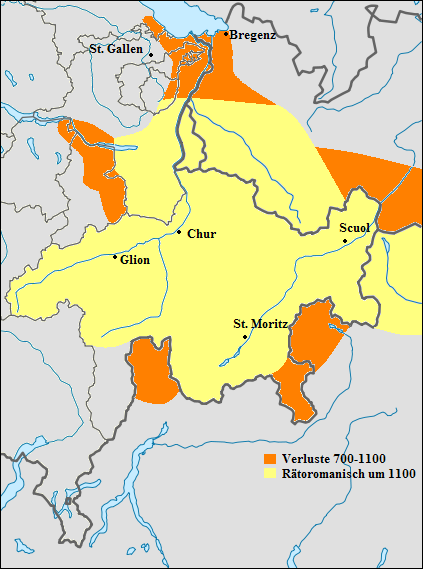
Romansh during the early Middle Ages lost to German and Lombard, 700–1100 Romansh-speaking area, c. 1100

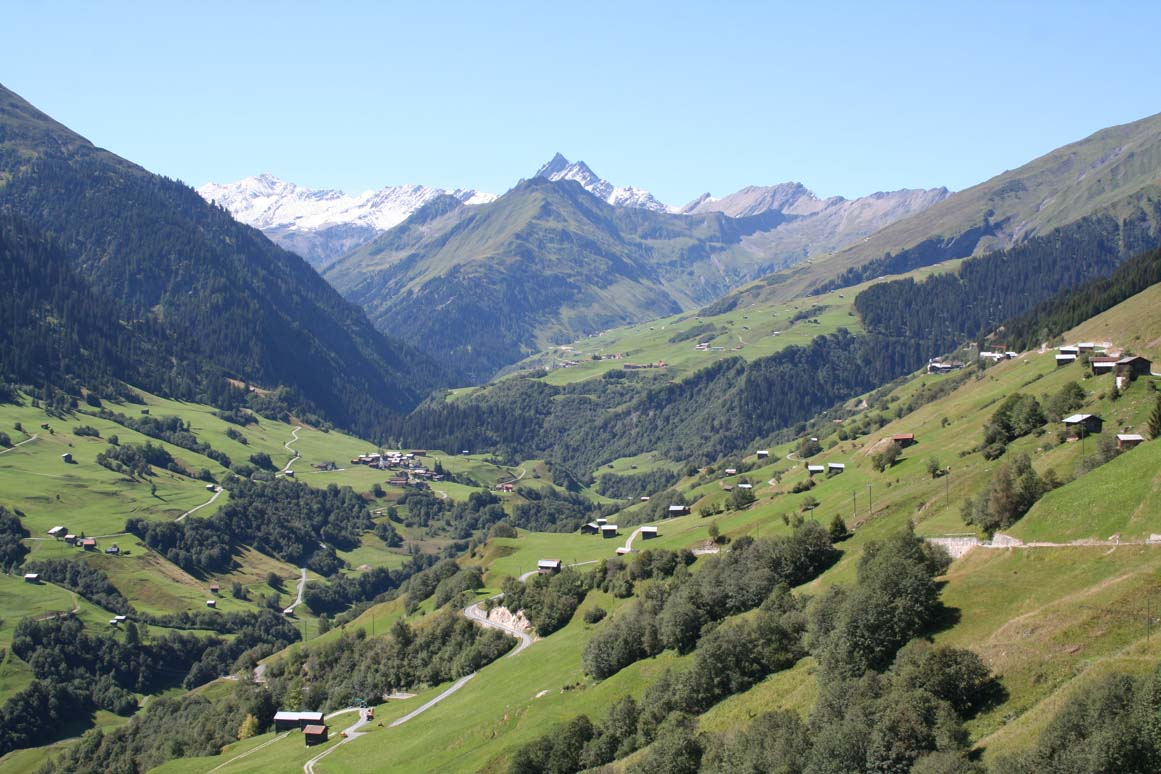
Vrin, is the Swiss municipality with 95.6% of people naming Romansh as their language of best command in 2000.

Most of the lands of the region were once part of a Roman province called Raetia, which was established in 15 BCE. The current capital of Graubünden, Chur, was known as Curia in Roman times. The area was later part of the diocese of Chur. A Roman road crossed Liechtenstein from south to north, traversing the Alps by the Splügen Pass and following the right bank of the Rhine at the edge of the floodplain, for long uninhabited because of periodic flooding. Some Roman villas have been excavated in Schaanwald and Nendeln. Nearly 2,000 years later, some of the population of Graubünden still speak Romansh which has descended from Vulgar Latin.

By 259, Alamanni tribes had overrun the Limes and caused widespread devastation of Roman cities and settlements in the Crisis of the Third Century. The Roman Empire succeeded in re-establishing the Rhine as the border, but it was now a frontier province. The late Roman influx from the north by the Alemanni also influenced the makeup of the Principality of Liechtenstein and is also evidenced by the remains of a Roman fort at Schaan. Roman villas have been excavated in Schaanwald and Nendeln.

The area that Innsbruck is located in was probably inhabited in the early Stone Age. Several surviving pre-Roman place names exist in and about the city.

In the 4th century Chur also became the seat of the first Christian bishopric north to the Alps. Despite a legend assigning its foundation to a legendary British king, St Lucius, the first known bishop is one Asinio in AD 451.

=== Early history ===
In the 6th century the Slavs settled the area, and the local dioceses collapsed. This is shown in archaeological culture. A Slavic language group was established in the area. The Alpine Slavs, who are reckoned to be ancestors of present-day Slovenes, also settled in the easternmost mountainous areas of Friuli, known as the Friulian Slavia, as well in as the Karst Plateau and the area north and south of Gorizia. At this time, Chur was also conquered by the Franks. After the fall of the Western Roman Empire, Ticino was ruled by the Ostrogoths, the Lombards and the Franks.

The Alemanni or Alamanni, were a confederation of Germanic tribes on the Upper Rhine River. Eastern Switzerland, Vorarlberg and Liechtenstein was under the Alemanni and 73% of Liechtenstein's current population still speak the native Alemannic dialect of German at home as of 2022.

After the fall of the Ostrogothic Kingdom in 553, the Germanic tribe of the Lombards invaded Italy via the Tyrol and founded the Lombard Kingdom of Italy, which no longer included all of Tyrol, but only its southern part. The northern part of Tyrol came under the influence of the Bavarii, while the west was probably part of Alamannia.

Most of Tyrol came under the control of the Duchy of Bavaria (created c. 555) while the rest remained under the Lombards.

By the 590s AD, today's East Tyrol and Carinthia had come to be referred to in historical sources as Provincia Sclaborum (the Country of Slavs). The territory settled by Slavs, however, was also inhabited by remnants of the indigenous Romanised Celtic and Pannonian population, who preserved the Christian faith and helped convert the Slavs of Carantania.

From 623 to 658 Slavic peoples between the upper Elbe River and the Karawanks mountain range. They united under the leadership of King Samo (Kralj Samo). Carantania, (AKA: Carentania, Slovene: Karantanija, German: Karantanien, in Old Slavic *Korǫtanъ), was a former Alpine Slavic (Alpska Slovanščina)\proto-Slovenian principality that emerged from Samo's Empire in the second half of the 7th century, in the territory of present-day southern Austria and north-eastern Slovenia.

Carantania was absorbed into the Frankish Empire in 745.

The province of Lower Rhaetia was formed in 814.

The Frankish March of Carinthia, created within the Carolingian Empire in 889.

The city of Chur suffered several invasions: by the Magyars in 925–926, when the cathedral was destroyed, and by the Saracens (940 and 954), but afterwards it flourished thanks to its location, where the roads from several major Alpine transit routes come together and continue down the Rhine River. In 926 more Magyar raiders attacked the abbey and the nearby town of St Gallen.

The Lordship of Schellenberg was constituted in the 9th century by Charlemagne.

=== Medieval history ===
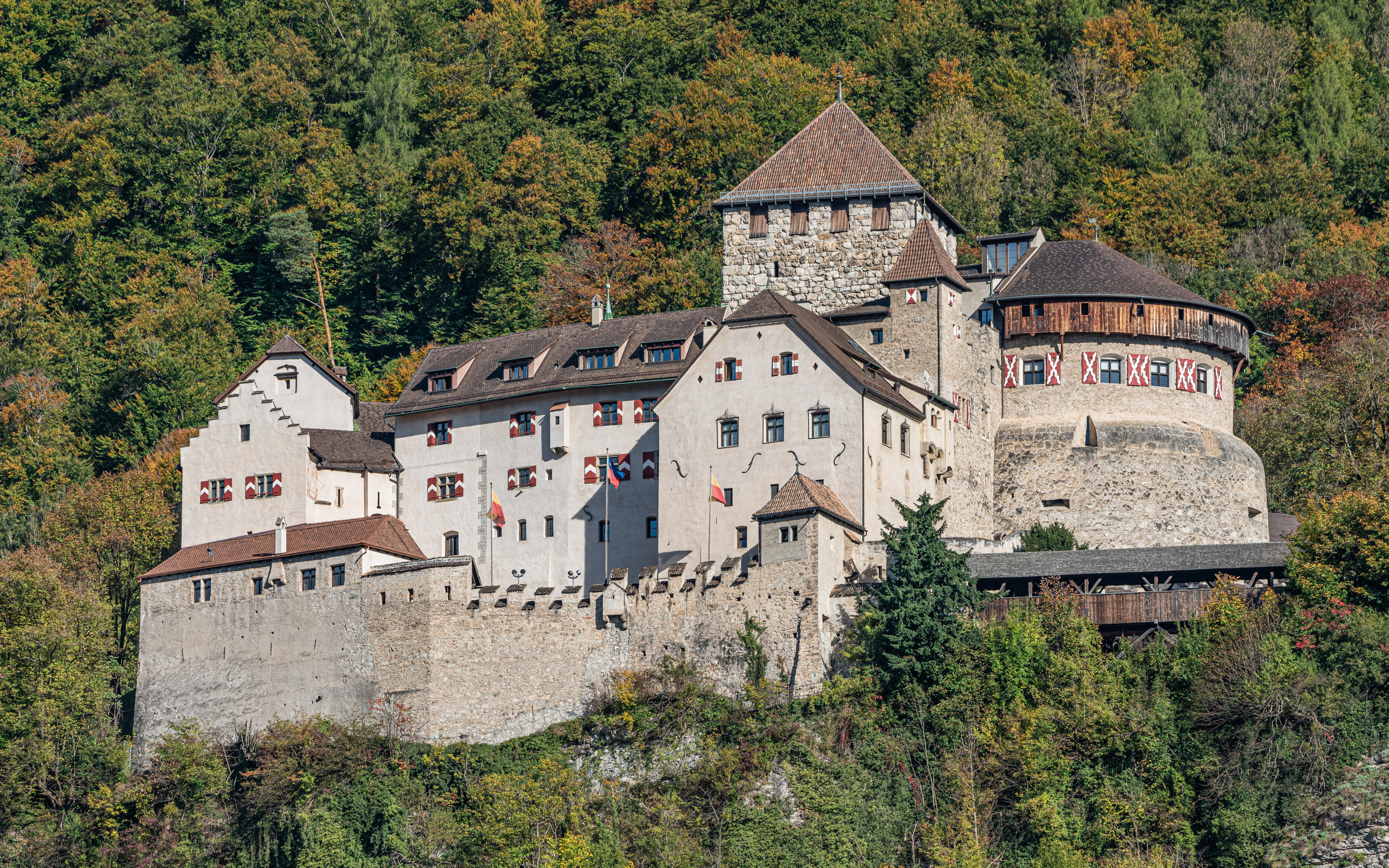
Vaduz Castle, built during the Middle Ages

In the years 1007 and 1027 the emperors of the Holy Roman Empire granted the counties of Trento and Vinschgau to the Bishopric of Trent and the Bishopric of Brixen the County of Norital in 1027 and the Puster Valley in 1091 by the county of Milan and Como.

By about 1100 Ticino was the centre of struggle between the free communes of Milan and Como.

The upper Rhine River had been visited by traders since Roman times, but acquired greater importance under the Ottonian dynasty of the Holy Roman Empire. Emperor Otto I appointed his vassal Hartpert as bishop of Chur in 958 and awarded the bishopric numerous privileges. In 1170 the bishop became a prince-bishop and kept total control over the road between Chur and Chiavenna.

The first written evidence of a settlement at Innsbruck dates back to 1180 and the town named Oeni Pontum or Oeni Pons which is Latin for bridge (pons) over the Inn River (Flumen Oenus). It was built there some time earlier than its first recorded account, possibly even around Roman Veldidena in the 4th century, due to the important crossing point over the Inn River. The Counts of Andechs first acquired the town in 1180 and then the town passed into the hands of the Counts of Tyrol in 1248

From upper Valais, the Walser began to spread south, west and east between the 12th and 13th centuries, in the so-called Walser migrations (Walserwanderungen). Nearly 1,500 years later the people of Triesenberg in Liechtenstein still speak a dialect of German that was influence of Walser migrants from the early in the 14th century.

In the 13th century Chur had some 1,300 inhabitants and was surrounded by a line of walls. In 1367 the foundation of the Three Leagues in the area was a first step towards Chur's autonomy: a burgmeister (mayor) is first mentioned in 1413, and the bishop's residence was attacked by the inhabitants. Chur was the chief town of the Gotteshausbund or Chadé (League of the House of God), and one of the regular meeting places of the assemblies of the Leagues. As the power of the bishops, now increasingly under the influence of the nearby Habsburg County of Tyrol, decreased, in 1464 the citizens wrote a constitution which was adopted as the rule for the peoples of the local guilds and political positions.

The medieval county of Vaduz was formed in 1342 as a small subdivision of the Werdenberg county of the dynasty of Montfort of Vorarlberg. (German: Grafschaft Vaduz) was a historic state of the Holy Roman Empire

In 1367 the League of God's House (Cadi, Gottes Haus, Ca' di Dio) was founded to resist the rising power of the Bishop of Chur. This was followed by the establishment of the Grey League (Grauer Bund), sometimes called Oberbund, in 1395 in the Upper Rhine valley.

In the 14th century it was acquired by the Visconti, Dukes of Milan. In the 15th century the Swiss Confederates conquered the valleys south of the Alps in three separate conquests.

The Lordship of Schellenberg was purchased by the Counts of Vaduz in 1437. Liechtenstein's borders have remained unchanged since 1434, when the Rhine was established as the border between the Holy Roman Empire and the newly formed Swiss cantons.

=== 18th Century ===
The County of Vaduz (German: Grafschaft Vaduz) was a historic state of the Holy Roman Empire and Lordship of Schellenberg became the Principality of Liechtenstein in 1719.

Prince-Bishop Franz Karl, Count von Lodron (18 November 1748 – 10 August 1828) saw his temporal powers over of the prince-bishopric of Brixen rapidly diminish prior to the secularisation of Brixen and Trent in 1803.

=== 19th century ===
When Graubünden became a Swiss canton in 1803, Chur was chosen as its capital. The lands of the Bishopric of Trent and Bishopric of Brixen were secularised and incorporated into the County of Tyrol.

Mt. Piz Bernina (4,049 m) was given its name in 1850 by Johann Coaz, who also made the first ascent.

The Brenner Railway was opened in 1867.

=== Modern history ===
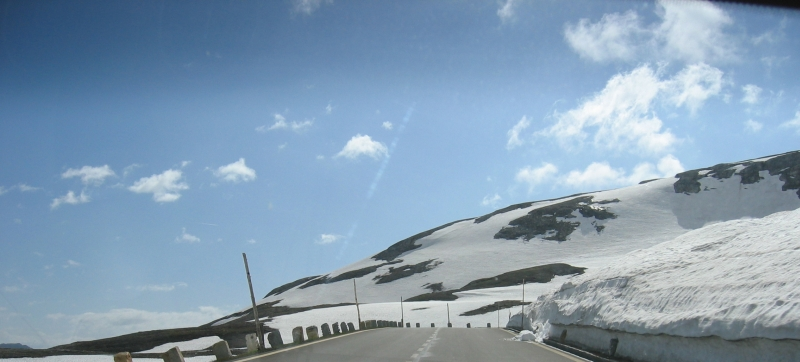
Snow cleared at the side of the road, in June.

Following World War I and the subsequent dissolution of Austria-Hungary, it was divided into two modern administrative parts through the Treaty of Saint-Germain-en-Laye. Lichtenstein also ended its customs union with Austro-Hungary in 1919.

Lichtenstein started its customs union with Switzerland in 1924.

The completion of the final portion of the FO railway occurred in 1926. It thus opened up the Cantons of Valais and Graubünden to further tourist development. This led to the introduction of Kurswagen (through coaches) between Brig and Chur, and between Brig and St. Moritz.

The Grossglockner High Alpine Road (in German Großglockner-Hochalpenstraße) opened in 1935.

The Hitlerian Kehlsteinhaus was built on the Kehlstein mountain in 1938.

Between 1943 and April 1945, Axis Forces held Innsbruck, which experienced 22 air raids by the Allied Forces and suffered heavy damage during World War 2. Switzerland and Lichtenstein remained neutral in the war.

The Jenner mountain had its summit made accessible from Schönau by an cable car (Jennerbahn) since in 1953.

The Tauern Autobahn (A 10) opened in 1975 and was completed in 1988.

Triglav National Park was founded in 1981. It was originally set out in 1924 on a smaller scale and scrapped between 1944 and 1961.

Bad Reichenhall was awarded Alpine town of the Year in 2001.

In 2005, the Carinthia Statistical Region was established, which covers a larger area of about 1,041 km^{2} (402 mi^{2}), at the expense of Styria.

== Economy ==
=== Tourism ===
Tourism in Graubünden is concentrated around the towns of Davos/Arosa, Flims and St. Moritz/Pontresina., as are Bad Ragaz and another in St. Margrethen in St. Gallen. Innsbruck is also a substantial tourist center in the Austrian Tyrol as is Municipality of Bovec in Slovenia.

=== Economy of Liechtenstein ===
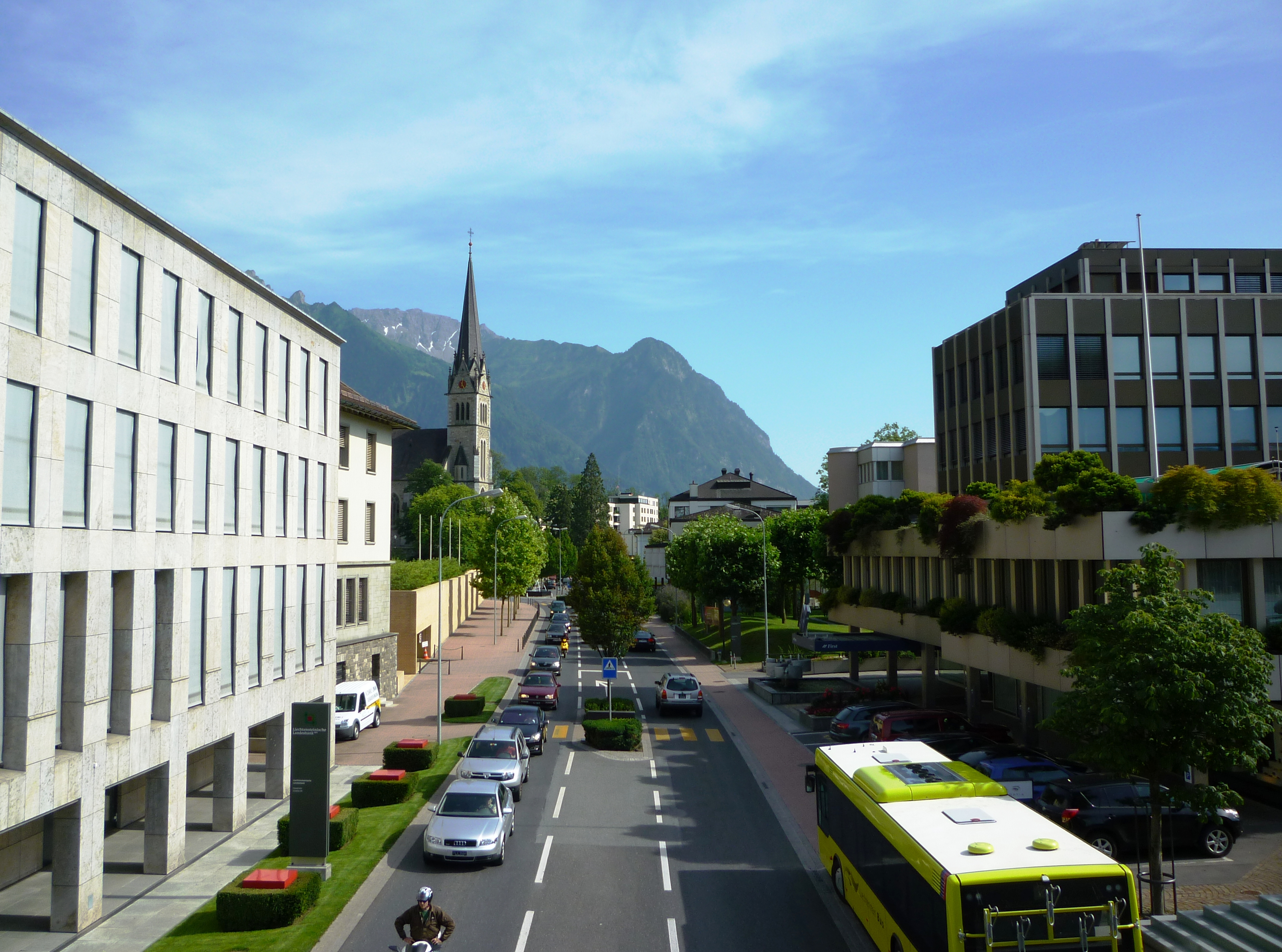
Looking southward at Vaduz city centre.

Liechtenstein participates in a customs union with Switzerland and employs the Swiss franc as its national currency. It is also a tax haven like Switzerland.

Industries include electronics, textiles, precision instruments, metal manufacturing, power tools, anchor bolts, calculators, pharmaceuticals, and food products (wheat, barley, corn, potatoes, dairy products, livestock, and wine).

The largest employer and most iconic corporate presence is Hilti, a manufacturer of direct fastening systems and other high-end power tools.

=== Agriculture in Graubünden ===
Only about 30% of Graubünden is commonly regarded as productive land, of which forests cover about a fifth of the total area. St. Moritz has a subarctic climate (Köppen: Dfc). The canton is entirely mountainous, comprising the highlands of the Rhine and Inn valleys. In its southeastern part lies the only official Swiss National Park. In its northern part the mountains were formed as part of the thrust fault that was declared a geologic UNESCO World Heritage Site, under the name Swiss Tectonic Arena Sardona, in 2008. Another Biosphere Reserve is the Biosfera Val Müstair adjacent to the Swiss National Park whereas Ela Nature Park is one of the regionally supported parks.

=== Agriculture St. Gallen ===
St. Gallen's agriculture is predominantly of dairy farming and cattle breeding in the mountainous areas, with fruit and wine production are important, but there is also mixed farming in the plains. St. Gallen has a humid continental climate (Dfb).

=== Industry in Carinthia ===
Austrian Carinthia has a humid continental climate (Köppen) and Solvinian Carinthia has an alpine climate, and partially a transitional continental climate with a mjor important element is temperature inversion.

Slovene Carinthia boasts a major Slovine steel mill, major hidro-electric dam (60 megawatts), a former lead smelter and some lead and zinc mines. Austrian Carinthia's main industries are tourism, electronics, engineering, forestry, and agriculture.

=== I.T. and technology in Trento ===
Trento is known for its university, technology and I.T. industries.

== Transport ==
=== Rail ===
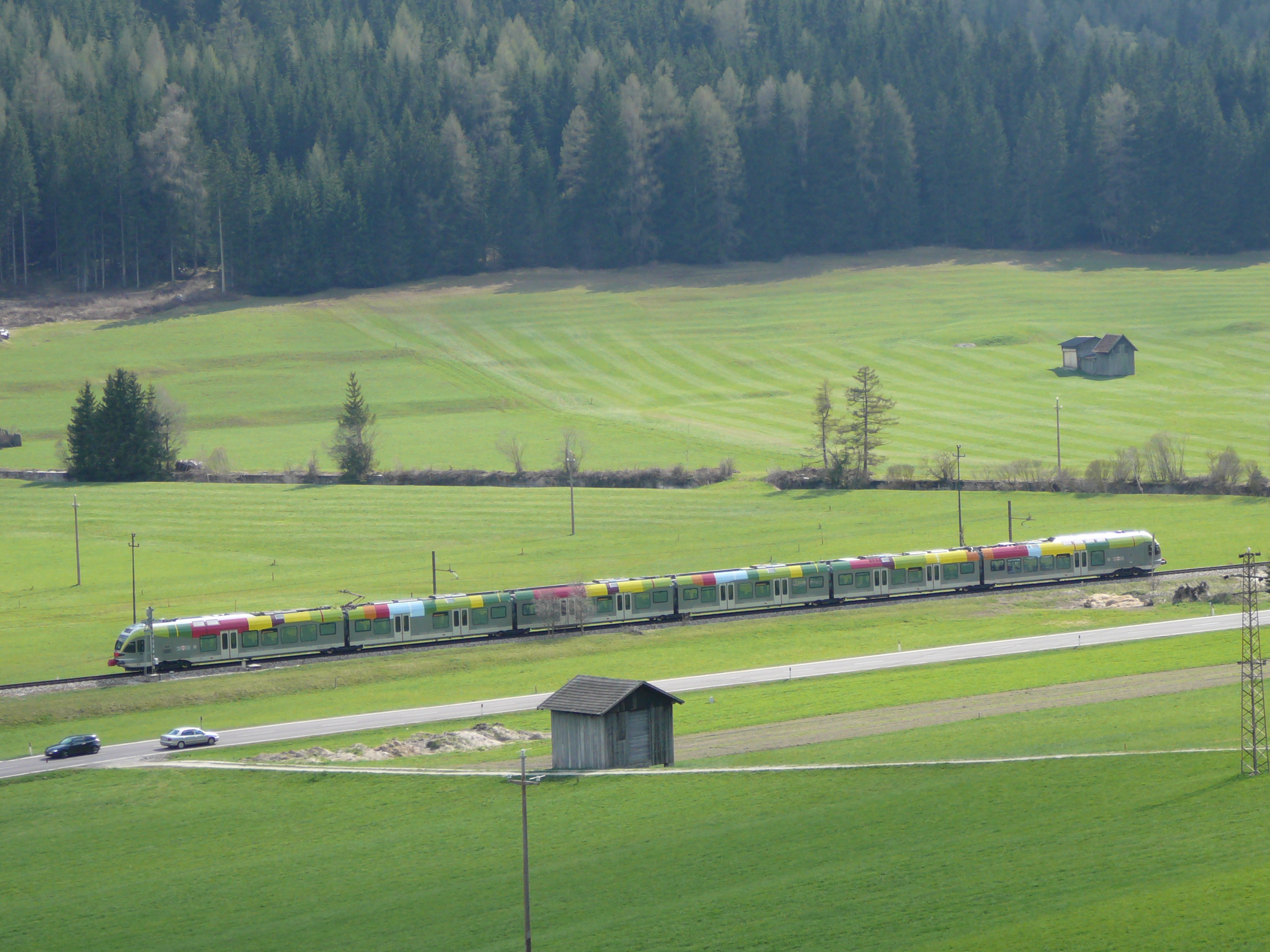
Pustertal railway.

The Brenner Railway, which opened in 1867, and the Lower Inn Valley Railway form part of the important trans-Alpine European railway axis known as the Berlin-Palermo railway axis.

The completion of the final portion of the FO railway occurred in 1926. It thus opened up the Cantons of Valais and Graubünden to further tourist development. This led to the introduction of Kurswagen (through coaches) between Brig and Chur, and between Brig and St. Moritz.

=== Road ===
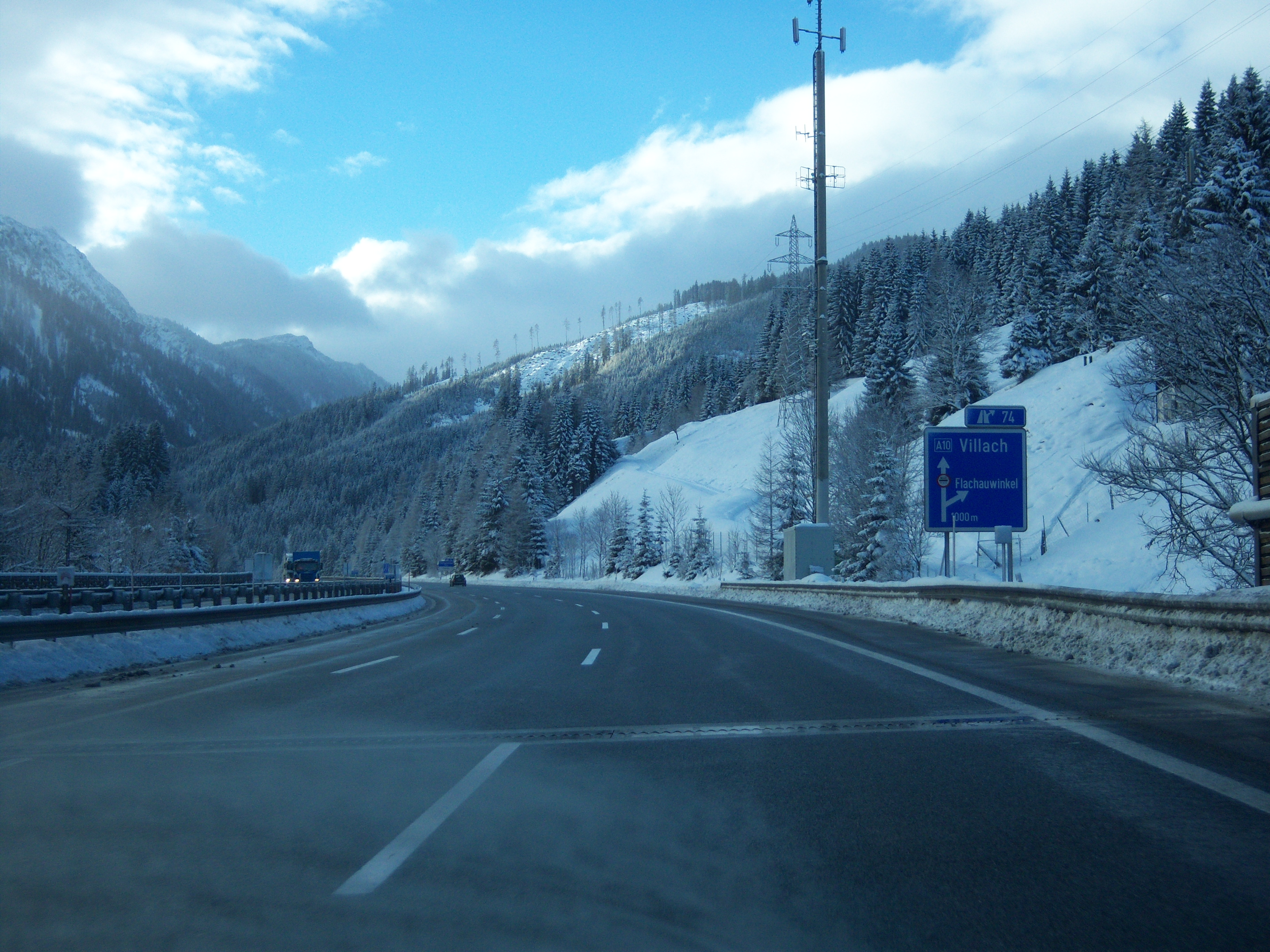
A 10, Flachau junction.

The Brenner Pass and the Katschberg Pass were historic passages through parts of the Alpes.

The Tauern Autobahn (A 10) is an autobahn (motorway) in Austria running from Salzburg to Villach in Carinthia via the Tauern mountain range It opened in 1975 and was completed in 1988.

The Grossglockner High Alpine Road (in German Großglockner-Hochalpenstraße) is the highest surfaced mountain pass road in Austria runs from Bruck in the state of Salzburg with Heiligenblut in the state of Carinthia via the Fuscher Törl and Hochtor Pass at 2,504 m (8,215 ft). It is named after the Grossglockner, Austria's highest mountain and was built as both a scenic route and a toll. It opened in 1935.

The Austrian states of Tirol and Vorarlberg are also connected by a pass road called the Silvretta Hochalpenstraße (at a height of 2032m).

== The Winter Olympics ==
In 1964 and 1976 they were held in Innsbruck. In 1956 and 2026, they were in Cortina.

== See also ==
- Western Alps
- Berchtesgadener Land
- Berchtesgaden Alps
- Berchtesgaden
- Bad Reichenhall
- Hochkönig
- Jenner
- Bischofshofen
- Salzburg
- Salzburgerland
- Berchtesgaden Alps
- Slavic settlement of the Eastern Alps
- Central Eastern Alps – also known as the Central Alps.
- Limestone Alps
- Periadriatic Seam
- Glarus thrust
- List of mountains of the canton of St. Gallen
- Economy of Liechtenstein
- Paganism in the Eastern Alps
- Venetic theory
- Puster Valley
