= Türel =

Türel is a surname. Notable people with the surname include:

- Menderes Türel (born 1964), Turkish politician
- Metin Türel (1937–2018), Turkish football coach

== See also ==
- Hurel
- Turle
