= Turle =

Turle is a surname. Notable people with the surname include:

- Charles Edward Turle (1883–1966), British Royal Navy officer
- Frederica J. Turle (1880–?), English writer
- James Turle (1802–1882), English classical organist and composer
- Henry Frederic Turle (1835–1883), English journalist

== See also ==
- Turle knot, fishing knot
- Turley
