= Hurel =

Hurel is a surname. Notable people with the surname include:

- Sandrine Hurel (born 1968), French politician
- Tony Hurel (born 1987), French cyclist
- Camille Hurel (born 1998), French model
- Charles Hurel, French Baroque composer, lutenist, and theorbist

== See also ==
- Hubel
- Türel
