= Mannlgrat =

Ridge in the Bavarian Alps

Coordinates: 47.6053°N 13.0539°E

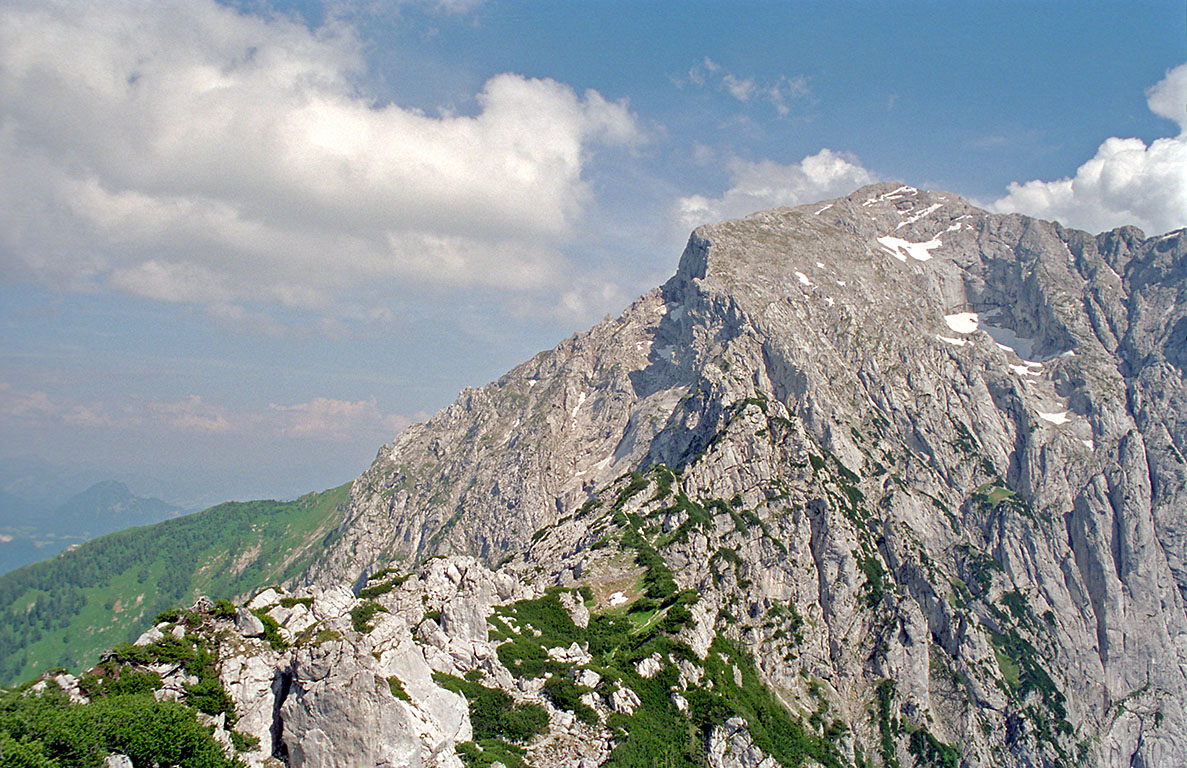
The Mannlgrat ridge runs from lower right towards the upper left this side of the Hoher Göll's summit

The Mannlgrat is an east-facing ridge on the Hoher Göll in the Bavarian Alps rising above Obersalzberg near Berchtesgaden.

The ridge rises from a col separating it from a subpeak of the Hoher Göll, the Kehlstein, upon which the famous Kehlsteinhaus is located. Served by a Klettersteig, the Mannlgrat is regarded as the easiest route to the Hoher Göll's summit.
