= Hubel =

Hubel, Hübel or Huebel is a German language topographic surname, denoting a person who lived near a hill (Middle High German hübel "hill") and may refer to:

- Allison Hubel, American mechanical engineer and cryobiologist
- David H. Hubel (1926–2013), Canadian American neurophysiologist
- Erich Hubel, Australian wheelchair basketballer
- Herbert Huebel (1889–1950), American football player, coach, and official
- Herbert Hübel (1958), Austrian lawyer and sports official
- Rob Huebel (1969), American actor, comedian and writer

== See also ==
- Silberhorn (Liechtenstein), a mountain also called Hubel
