= Silberhorn (Liechtenstein) =

Mountain in the Eastern Alps

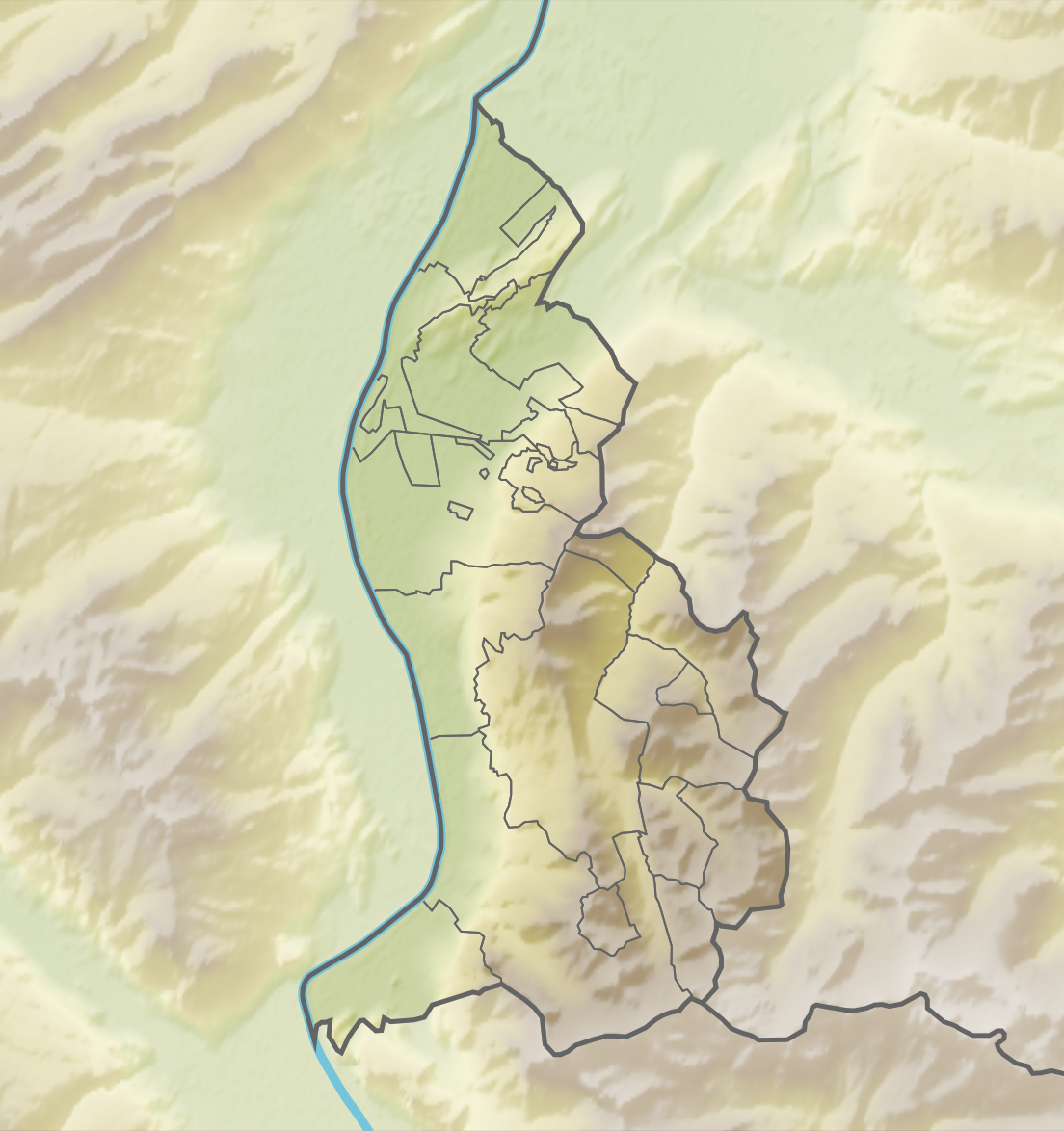
- Location within Liechtenstein

Highest point
- Elevation: 2,150 m (7,050 ft)
- Coordinates: 47°05′14.7″N 9°36′20.1″E

Geography
- Location: Liechtenstein
- Parent range: Rätikon, Alps

Silberhorn, or Hubel, is a mountain in Liechtenstein in the Rätikon range of the Eastern Alps close to the border with Austria, with a height of 2,150 metres (7,050 ft).
