= Henry Frederic Turle =

English journalist (1835–1883)

Henry Frederic Turle (1835–1883) was an English journalist, known as the editor of Notes and Queries.

== Life ==
He was the fourth son of James Turle, organist of Westminster Abbey, and was born in York Road, Lambeth, on 23 July 1835. The family moved in September 1841 to live in the cloisters of Westminster Abbey, and on 31 March 1845 he was admitted as a chorister at Westminster School. For the sake of his health, he spent from Christmas 1848 to the autumn of 1850 at the school of George Roberts at Lyme Regis; he was readmitted at Westminster on 3 October 1850.

From 1856 to 1863 Turle was a temporary clerk in a branch of the War Office in the Tower of London. In 1870 he became assistant to William John Thoms, the founder and editor of Notes and Queries. In 1872, when John Doran succeeded Thoms, Turle retained the position of sub-editor; and on Doran's death in 1878 he became editor. He was busy at work until his sudden death, from heart disease, on 28 June 1883, in his rooms at Lancaster House, The Savoy, London.

Turle was buried on 3 July in the family grave in Norwood cemetery. He was commemorated on the tablet which was placed to the memory of his parents, on the wall of the west cloister of Westminster Abbey.

== Notes ==
Attribution

This article incorporates text from a publication now in the public domain: Lee, Sidney, ed. (1899). "Turle, Henry Frederic". Dictionary of National Biography. Vol. 57. London: Smith, Elder & Co.
