= Mazorakopf =

Mountain in Switzerland and Liechtenstein

- Falknishorn
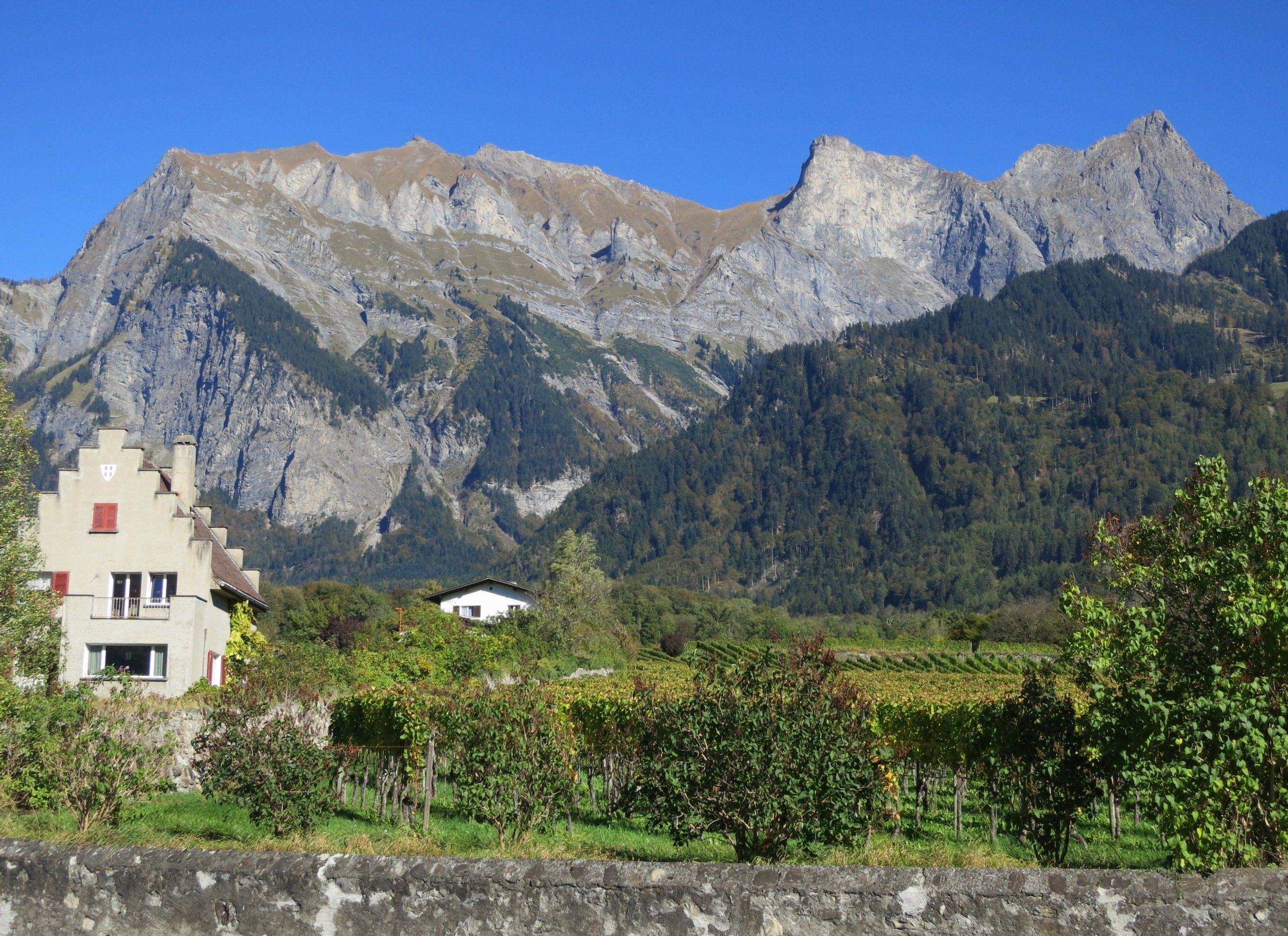
- Mazorakopf (left) viewed from the Swiss side

Highest point
- Elevation: 2,451.5 m (8,043 ft)
- Coordinates: 47°02′54.52″N 9°33′25.17″E

Geography
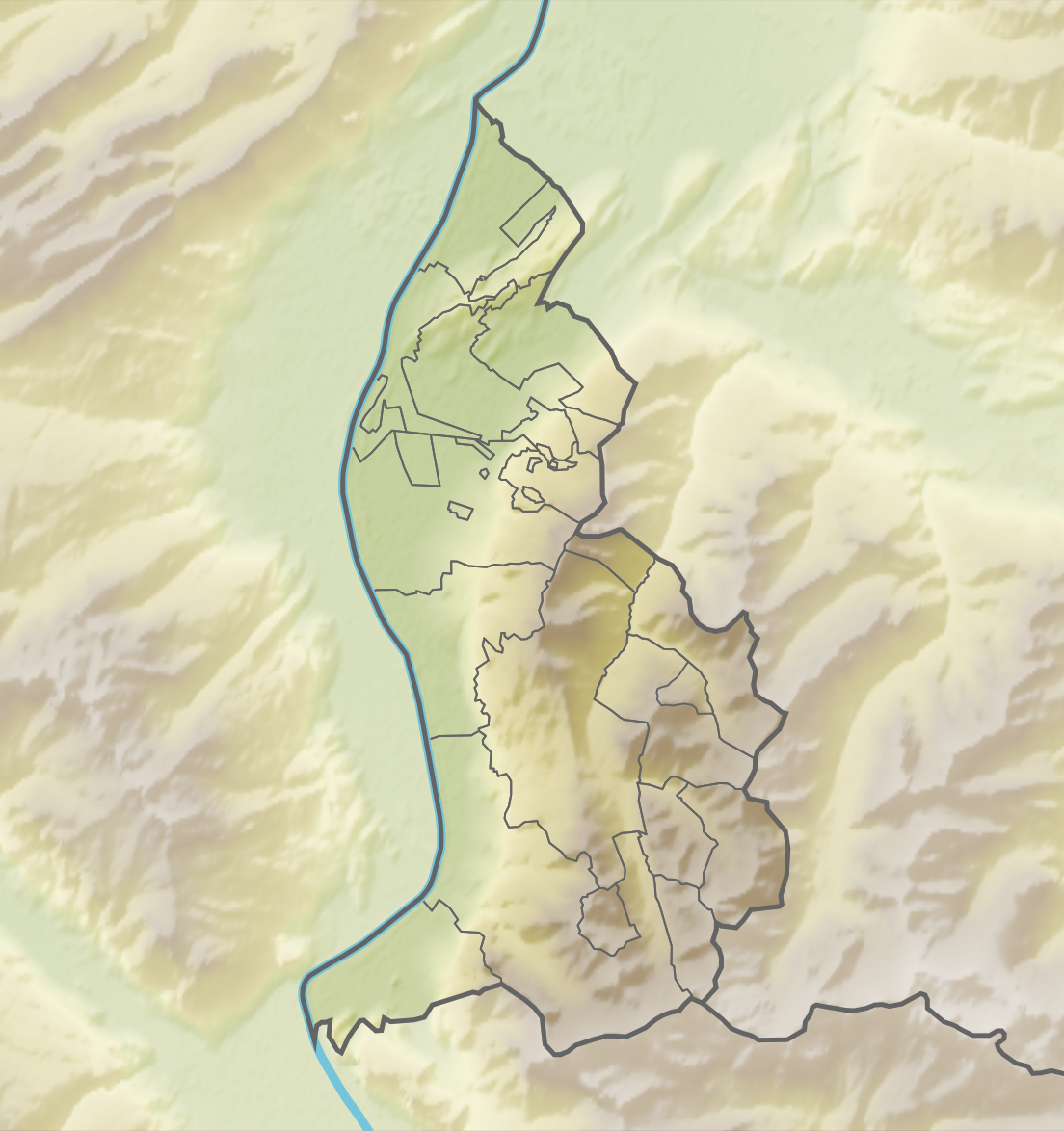
- Location within Liechtenstein
- Location: Liechtenstein / Switzerland
- Parent range: Rätikon

Mazorakopf or Falknishorn (2,451.5 metres [8,043 ft]) is a mountain on the border between Switzerland and Liechtenstein. It is the southernmost point of the principality of Liechtenstein.
