= Kehlstein =

Mountain in the Berchtesgaden Alps, near the Austrian-German border

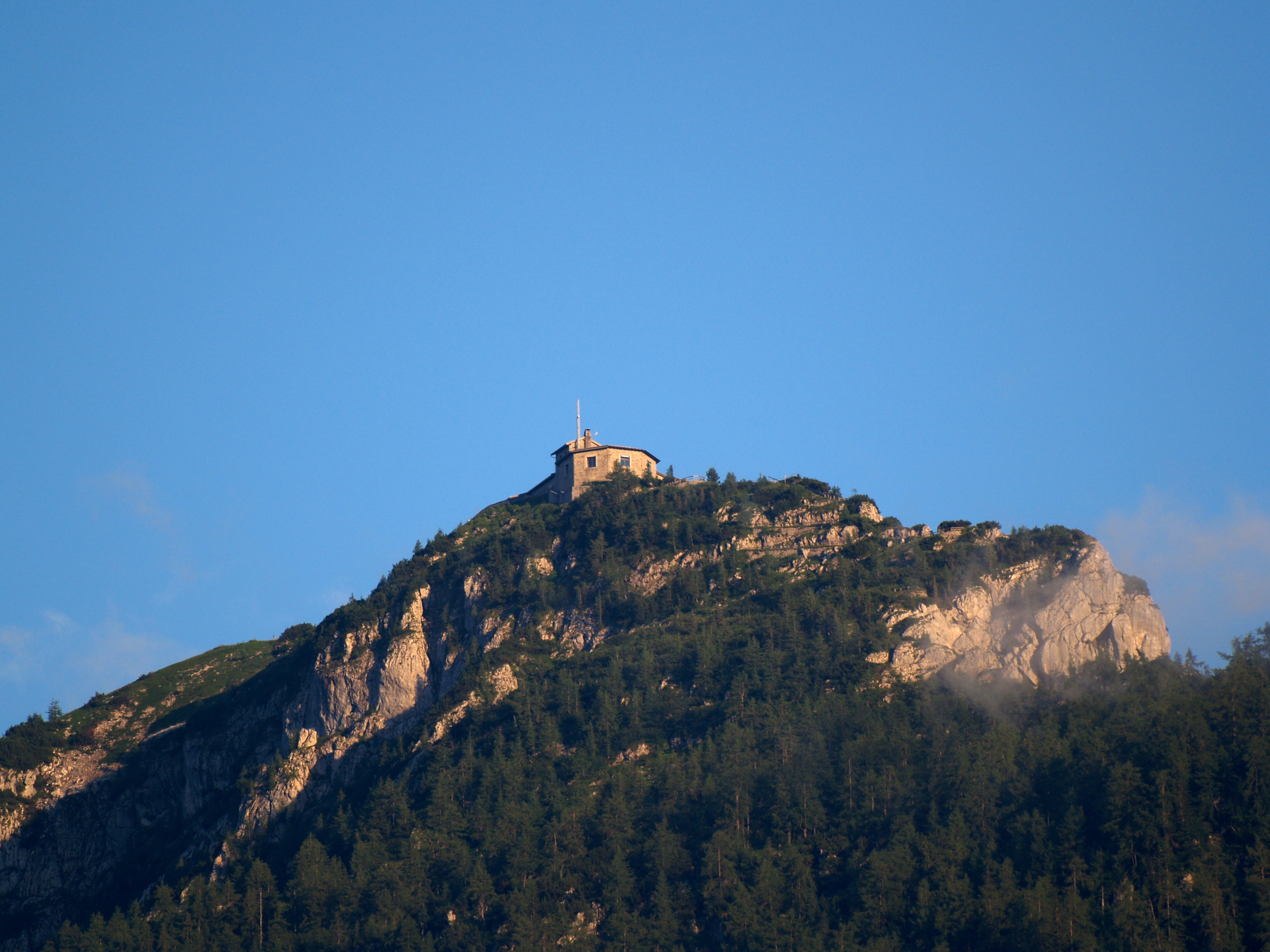
- Summit with Kehlsteinhaus

Highest point
- Elevation: 1,881 m (6,171 ft)
- Coordinates: 47°36′40″N 13°02′30″E

Geography
- Location within Alps Location within Bavaria
- Location: Berchtesgaden, Bavaria, Germany
- Parent range: Göll massif Berchtesgaden Alps

The Kehlstein (German pronunciation: [ˈkeːlʃtaɪn]) is a 1,881 m (6,171 ft) subpeak of the Göll massif, a 2,522 m (8,274 ft) mountain in the Berchtesgaden Alps. The rocky promontory is located west of the Hoher Göll main summit, high above the Obersalzberg mountain retreat near Berchtesgaden. It is chiefly known for the Kehlsteinhaus (Eagle's Nest) mountain inn built in 1937–1938, which today is a major tourist destination.

While other parts of the restricted Obersalzberg area around the former Berghof headquarters were turned into a US Armed Forces Recreation Center, the Kehlstein peak was made accessible to the public already in 1952. The motor road up to the Kehlsteinhaus, running 6.5 km (4.0 mi) uphill through several tunnels, is closed for private traffic; nevertheless, DB Regio bus service is provided in summer. From the upper turning place, a steep footpath leads to the restaurant. Guests may also use the 124 m (407 ft) Kehlsteinlift elevator running through the rocks directly to the reception area.

The Kehlstein spur offers a panoramic view over the Berchtesgaden Alps, including the Hoher Göll, Watzmann, Hochkalter and Untersberg peaks, as well as the Königssee lake and the city of Salzburg. From here a mountaineering trail leads up to the Mannlgrat, an east-facing ridge of the Hoher Göll. Served by a grade B Klettersteig, this route is regarded as the easiest to the main peak's summit. Near the Kehlsteinhaus is a small botanical garden containing a variety of Alpine flora.

== See also ==
- Dokumentationszentrum Obersalzberg
