= James Turle =

English organist and composer (1802–1882)

James Turle (5 March 1802 – 28 June 1882) was an English organist and composer, best known today as the writer of several widely sung Anglican chants and the hymn tune "Westminster" sung to the words of Frederick William Faber "My God, how wonderful thou art".

Turle was born at Taunton, Somerset, and started as a choirboy at Wells Cathedral. In 1817 he became a pupil of George Ebenezer Williams, organist at Westminster Abbey in London, and after acting as deputy for some years he succeeded to this post himself in 1831 and held it until his death. He and Sir John Goss, the organist at St Paul's Cathedral, had been fellow pupils in London as boys. Turle was a great organist in his day, and composed a good deal of church music which was well known. His son Henry Frederic Turle (1835–1883) was a journalist.

== Notes ==
Cultural offices
Preceded by Thomas Greatorex	Organist and Master of the Choristers of Westminster Abbey; 1831–1882	Succeeded by Frederick Bridge
