= Kehlsteinhaus =

Nazi-era chalet in Obersalzberg, Germany

Eagle's Nest
- Kehlsteinhaus
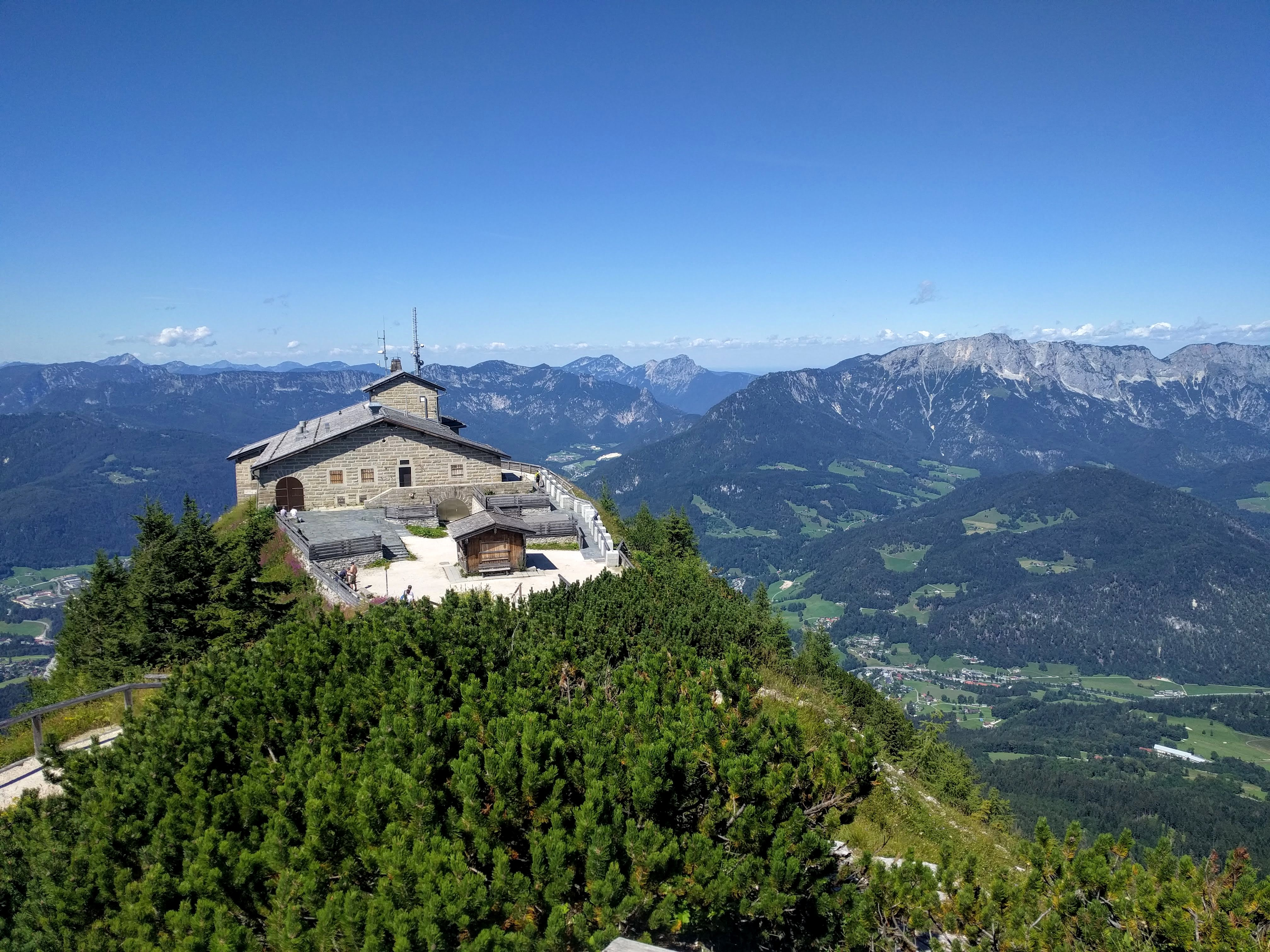
- The Kehlsteinhaus in August 2020

- Location within Bavaria Location within Germany

General information
- Status: Mostly destroyed
- Type: Chalet
- Location: Obersalzberg, Berchtesgaden, Germany
- Coordinates: 47°36′41.4″N 13°02′31.7″E
- Elevation: 1,834 m (6,017 ft)
- Completed: 1938
- Inaugurated: 20 April 1939

Website
- kehlsteinhaus.de/en

The Kehlsteinhaus, commonly known in English as the Eagle's Nest, is a Nazi-era chalet situated atop the Kehlstein, a subpeak of the Hoher Göll above Obersalzberg, near Berchtesgaden in southeastern Germany. Completed in 1938, it was commissioned by Martin Bormann on behalf of the Nazi Party for Adolf Hitler, and was intended to host diplomatic functions. Despite its enormous construction cost, (Note: According to Florian Beieri, its inflation-adjusted cost of 30 million Reichsmark was equivalent to approximately 150 million euro in 2001 (€257 million in 2026). In 1970, Albert Speer wrote that Bormann spent at least 20 million Reichsmark on the access roads and elevator alone.) Hitler made only 14 brief visits to the Kehlsteinhaus, preferring his nearby Berghof residence.

The Kehlsteinhaus survived World War II. The Bavarian government initially intended to demolish the building, but elected to operate it as a historical tourist destination with a restaurant and beer garden. On 23 October 2026, a suspected arson attack caused extensive fire damage to the building.

== Construction ==
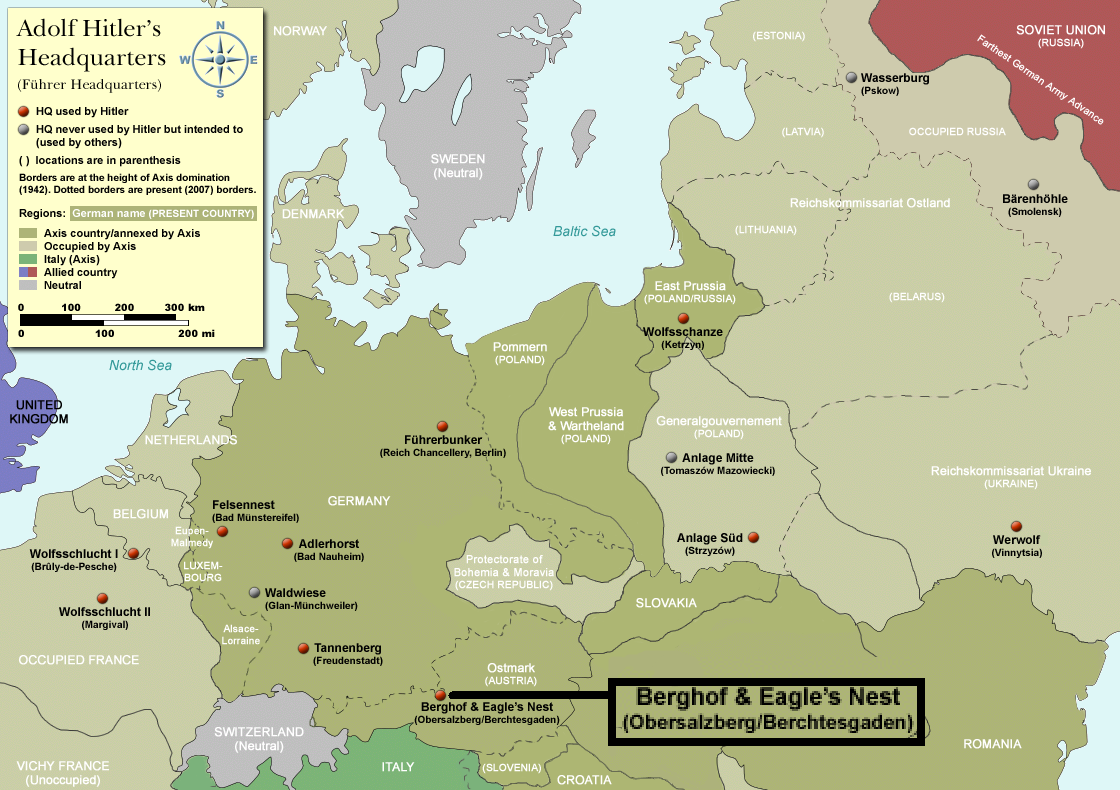
Map showing the location of the Eagle's Nest and other headquarters of the Führer

The Kehlsteinhaus sits on a ridge atop the Kehlstein, a 1,834-metre (6,017 ft) subpeak of the Hoher Göll that rises above the town of Berchtesgaden. It was commissioned by Martin Bormann in the summer of 1937. Paid for by the Nazi Party, it was completed in 13 months. Twelve workers died during its construction.

A 4-metre (13 ft) wide approach road climbs 800 m (2,600 ft) over 6.5 km (4.0 mi); it includes five tunnels and one hairpin turn. It cost 30 million ℛ︁ℳ︁ to build (about $150 million euro in 2001, or 257 million euro in 2026). Hitler's birthday in April 1939 was considered a deadline for the project's completion, so work continued throughout the winter of 1938, even at night, with the worksite lit by searchlights. According to Albert Speer, Bormann spent between 20 and 30 million marks on the access routes alone.

From a large car park, a 124-metre (407 ft) entry tunnel leads to an ornate elevator that ascends the final 124 m (407 ft) to the building. The tunnel is lined with marble and was originally heated with warm air from an adjoining service tunnel. Visiting high officials were to be driven through the tunnel to the elevator. Their driver would then have to reverse the car for the entire length of the tunnel, as it lacked space to turn around.

The red marble fireplace was a gift from Italian dictator Benito Mussolini.

The inside of the large elevator is surfaced with Venetian mirrors, made of polished brass, and green leather. The building's main reception room is dominated by a fireplace of red Italian marble presented by Italian dictator Benito Mussolini, which was damaged by Allied soldiers chipping off pieces to take home as souvenirs. The building had a completely electric appliance kitchen, which was unusual in 1937, but was never used to cook meals; instead, meals were prepared in town and taken to the kitchen on the mountaintop to be reheated. The building also features heated floors, with heating required for at least two days before visitors arrived. A MAN submarine diesel engine and an electrical generator were installed in an underground chamber close to the main entrance to provide back-up power.

== Use ==
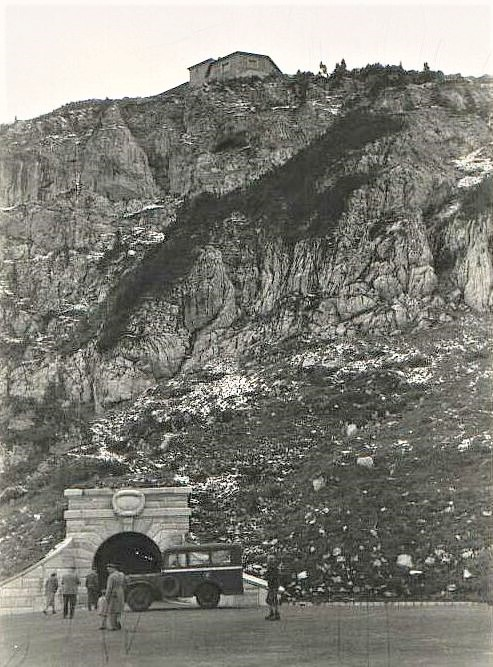
The tunnel leading to the elevator going up to the Kehlsteinhaus, visible above (1945)

Hitler first visited on 16 September 1938 and returned to inaugurate it on 20 April 1939, his 50th birthday, though it was not intended as a birthday gift.

According to Albert Speer, Hitler visited "only a few times", and when figures in Hitler's entourage remarked about Bormann's excessive spending on the project, Hitler "regretted the hubbub", and remarked "it's Bormann's doing. I don't want to interfere".

Hitler did not trust the elevator serving the Kehlsteinhaus, one of two final access routes to the building (the other being a road) and expressed reservations about its safety. He held concerns that the elevator's winch mechanism on the roof would attract a lightning strike. Bormann never mentioned the two lightning strikes that occurred during construction and which caused major damage.

In a rare diplomatic engagement at the Kehlsteinhaus, Hitler received departing French ambassador André François-Poncet there on 18 October 1938. The ambassador dubbed the building the "Eagle's Nest", a term now widely used.

A wedding reception for Eva Braun's sister Gretl was held there after her marriage to Hermann Fegelein on 3 June 1944. While Hitler usually left the entertaining duties to others, he believed the house excellent for entertaining important and impressionable guests.

Referred to as the "D-Haus", short for "Diplomatic Reception House", the Kehlsteinhaus is often conflated with the teahouse on Mooslahnerkopf Hill near the Berghof, to which Hitler walked daily after lunch. The teahouse was demolished by the Bavarian government after the war, due to its connection to Hitler.

The building is 6.5 km away from the Berghof, Hitler's summer home.

== Allied capture ==
The Kehlsteinhaus was a target during the 25 April 1945 bombing of Obersalzberg, an operation conducted by the Royal Air Force’s No. 1, No. 5, No. 8, and No. 617 Squadrons. However, the small building was not directly hit. Instead, the raid’s 359 Avro Lancasters and 16 de Havilland Mosquitoes caused severe damage to the Berghof area.

Uncertainty exists regarding which Allied unit was the first to reach the Kehlsteinhaus. Popular accounts often confuse the capture of the building with that of the town of Berchtesgaden, which was entered by elements of the French 2e Division Blindée (notably the "La Nueve" company of Spanish Republicans) on 4 May, as well as by the U.S. 7th Infantry Regiment. (Note: According to Dwight D. Eisenhower, supreme commander of U.S. forces in Europe, the 3rd Infantry Division was the first to take the town of Berchtesgaden; the Eagle's Nest is never mentioned. General Maxwell D. Taylor, former commanding general of the 101st Airborne Division, then attached to the XXI Corps, agreed.)

Troops of the 2e Division Blindée—including Laurent Touyeras, Georges Buis, and Paul Répiton-Préneuf—were present during the night of 4–5 May, collecting personal items and taking photographs before American forces arrived. The French troops left on 10 May at the request of U.S. command. Numerous Spanish veterans who participated with them agree that the French arrived first.

Some reports state that members of the U.S. 7th Infantry reached as far as the elevator to the Kehlsteinhaus. One account claims that two soldiers, Herman Louis Finnell and his ammunition carrier, were the first to enter the building and its underground passages, describing rooms filled with destroyed paintings, evening gowns, medical equipment, and a wine cellar. However, Finnell stated that his regiment entered the Berghof, not the Kehlsteinhaus. The 101st Airborne Division has also claimed it was first to both Berchtesgaden and the Kehlsteinhaus.

The Kehlsteinhaus was not damaged in the April bombing raid. It was later used by the Allies as a military command post until 1960, when it was returned to the State of Bavaria.

== Today ==
The Kehlsteinhaus in 2011, photographed on its west side.

The building is owned by a charitable trust.

Before the 2026 fire, it had been operating as a restaurant with indoor dining and an outdoor beer garden. It was a popular tourist attraction due to its historical significance. The road had been closed to private vehicles since 1952 because it was too narrow for two-way travel. The house can be reached on foot (in two hours) from Obersalzberg, or by bus from the Documentation Centre. The Documentation Centre directed visitors to the coach station, where tickets were purchased. The bus ticket served as an entry ticket, as it permitted the holder entry to the building's elevator. The buses were modified to ascend the steep road leading to the peak. In 2023, the shuttle buses were made fully electric. The Kehlsteinhaus interior offered little information about its past. Photos displayed on the sun terrace wall documented the preconstruction location and later history.

Informal tours of the Kehlsteinhaus could be booked through the website. Due to concern about neo-Nazis and postwar Nazi sympathizers, no external guides were permitted to conduct tours.

The lower rooms were not part of the restaurant, but could be visited with a guide. They offered views of the building's past through plate-glass windows. Graffiti left by Allied troops was visible in the surrounding woodwork. The red Italian marble fireplace was damaged by Allied souvenir hunters. Hitler's small study was made into a storeroom for the cafeteria.

A trail leads above the Kehlsteinhaus towards the Mannlgrat ridge reaching from the Kehlstein to the summit of the Hoher Göll. The route, which is served by a Klettersteig, is regarded as the easiest to the top.

=== 2026 fire ===
On 23 October 2026, a major fire broke out at the Kehlsteinhaus and engulfed the entire building, partially destroying it. Most of the inside was destroyed, but the fireplace gifted by Mussolini, the stone walls and foundation within the Kehlsteinhaus remained. An estimated 200 firefighters worked overnight to extinguish the fire. They had to wear "heavy breathing apparatus" due to Kehlsteinhaus' high altitude.

A 33-year-old German man fleeing the scene by motorbike was arrested on suspicion of arson and was subsequently committed to a psychiatric hospital.

Although the police believe that the site is unsalvageable, Joachim Herrmann, the Bavarian Interior Minister, says that it should not remain a ruin, and will be rebuilt. The building is owned by the German state of Bavaria.

== Gallery ==
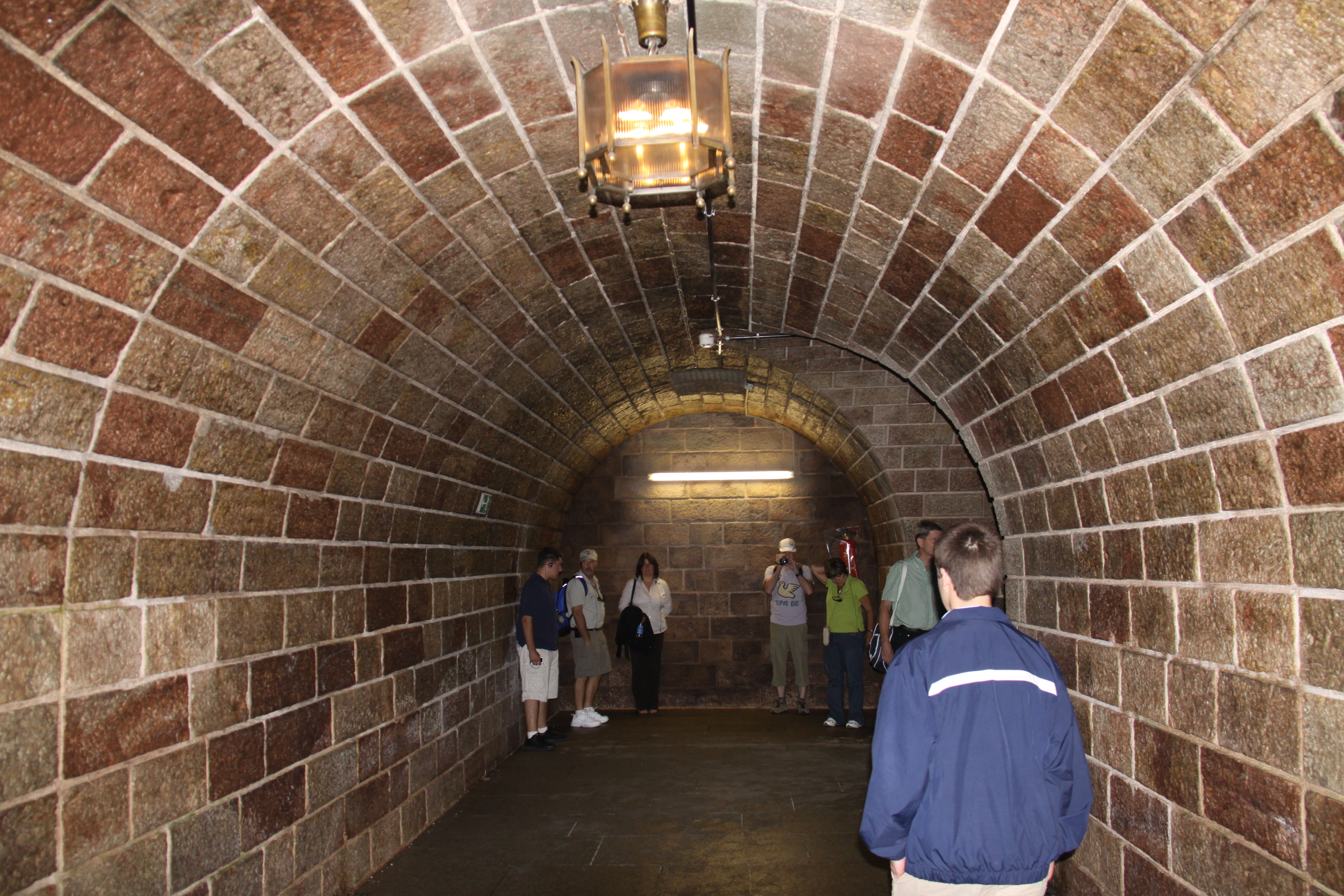
Tunnel leading to the Kehlsteinhaus elevator

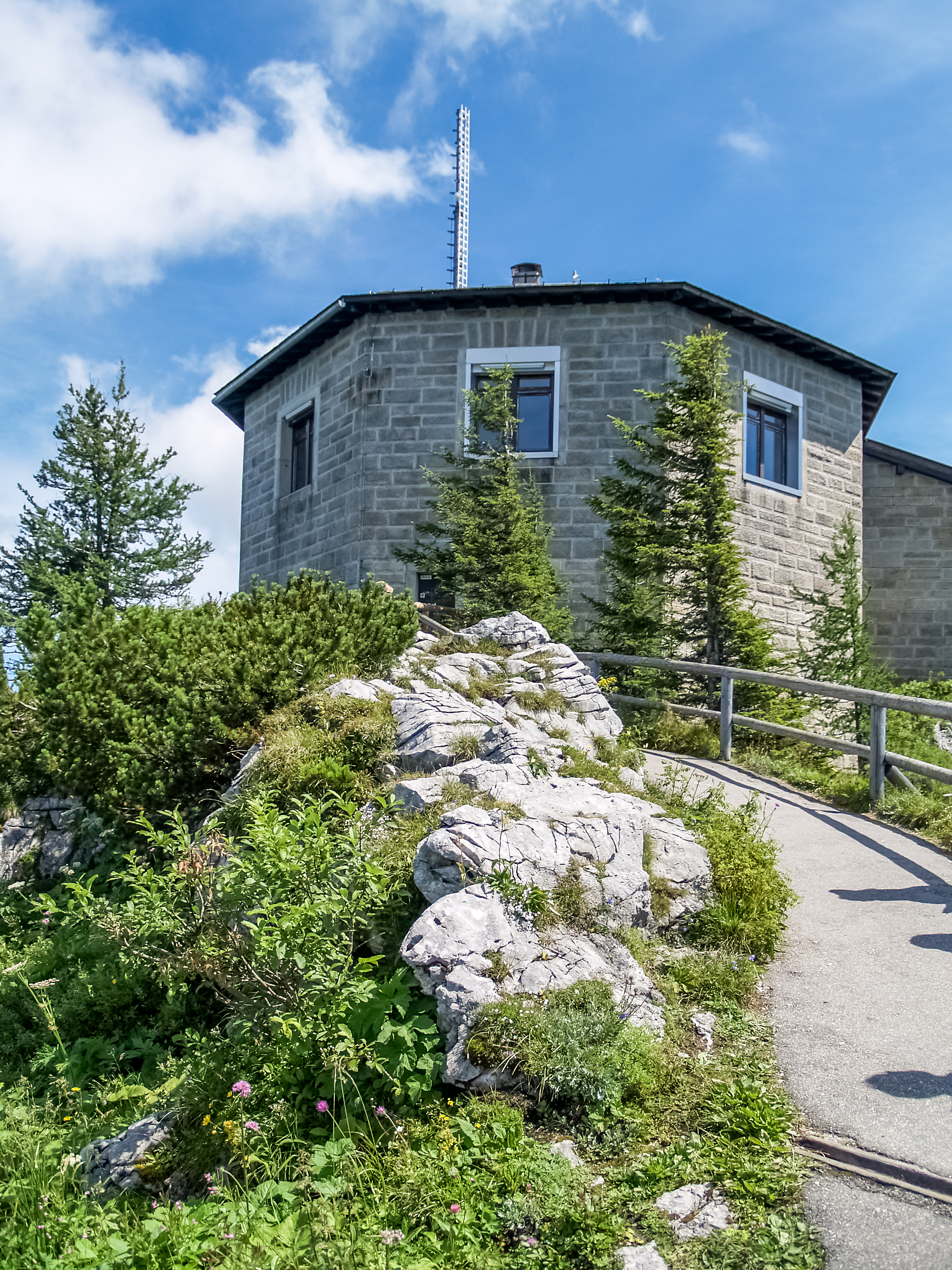
The Kehlsteinhaus from below

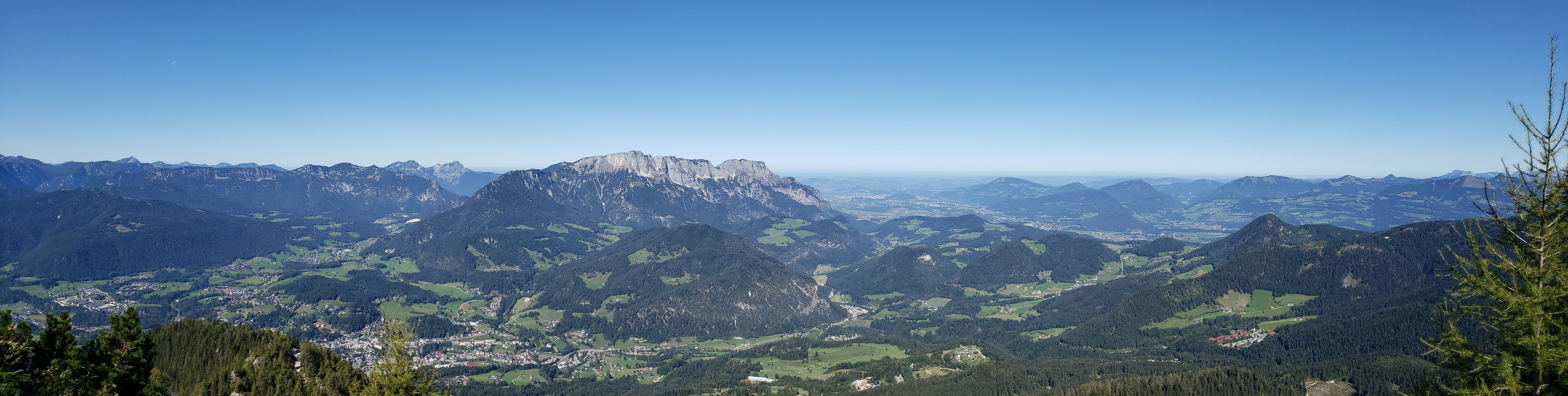
Panoramic view of Berchtesgaden and Obersalzberg from the Kehlsteinhaus

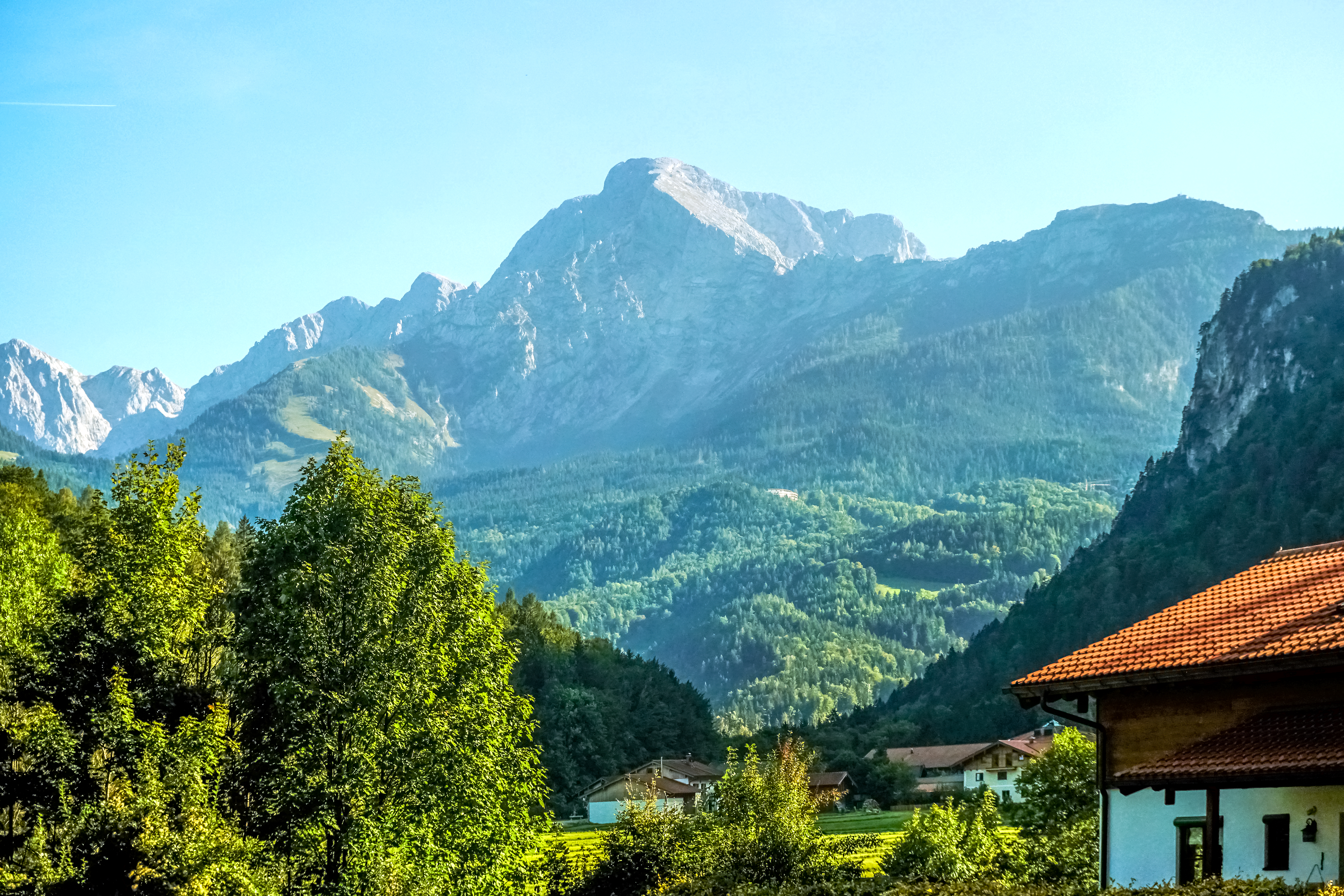
The Kehlsteinhaus visible atop the tree-covered mountain (right background)

Paragliding in the 80s at Kehlsteinhaus, when it was "allowed".
