= Hoher Göll =

Mountain on the Austrian-German border

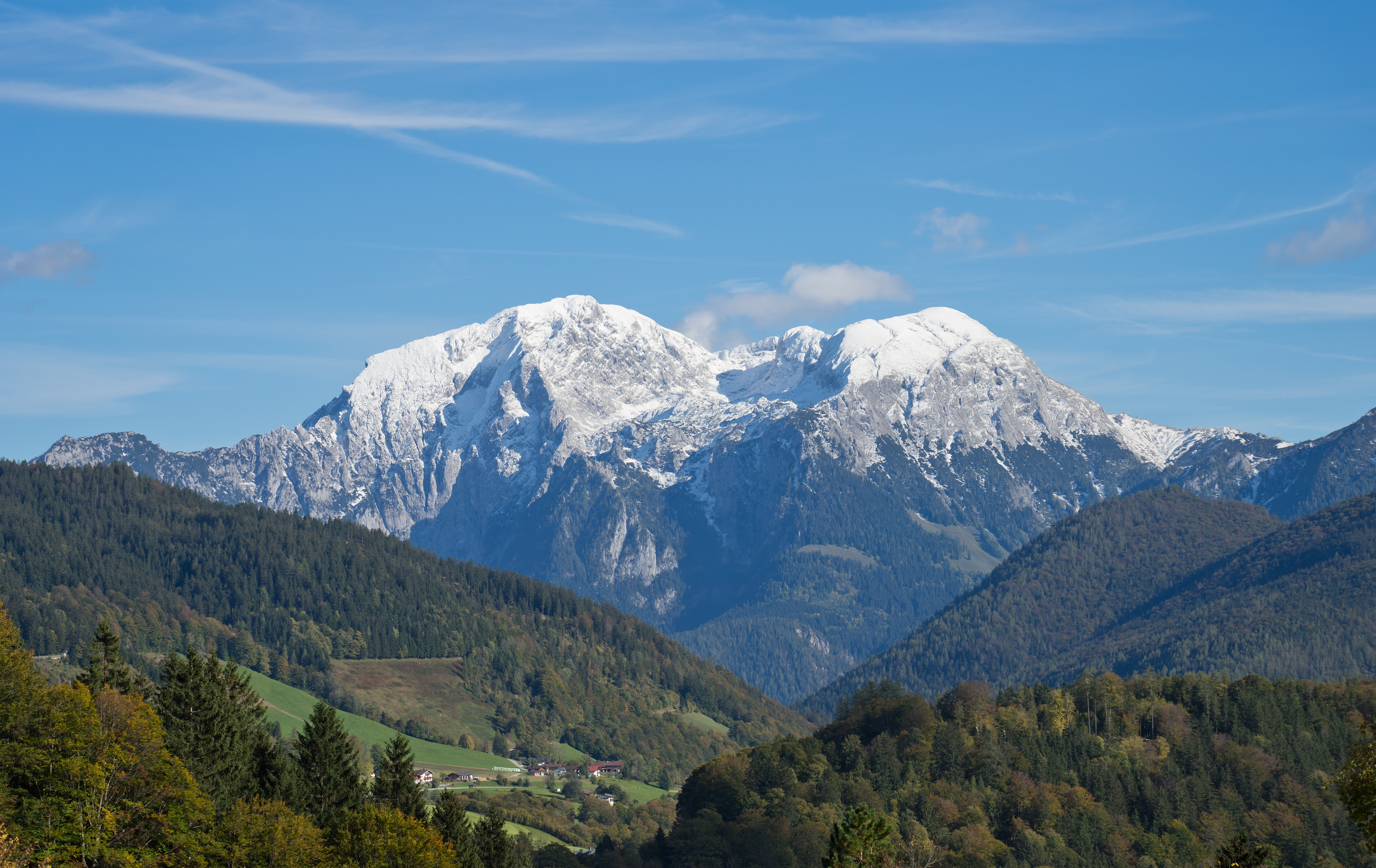
- The Hoher Göll (left) dominates the Göll massif from the west. On the right is Hohes Brett; Kehlstein is visible at far left.

Highest point
- Elevation: 2,522 m (8,274 ft)
- Prominence: 789 m (2,589 ft)
- Coordinates: 47°35′39″N 13°4′1″E

Geography
- Location within Alps
- Location: Bavaria, Germany; Salzburg, Austria
- Parent range: Berchtesgaden Alps

Climbing
- First ascent: 4 September 1800 by Valentin Stanič

The Hoher Göll (German pronunciation: [ˈhoːɐ̯ ˈɡœl]) is a 2,522 m (8,274 ft) mountain in the Berchtesgaden Alps. It is the highest peak of the Göll massif, which straddles the border between the German state of Bavaria and the Austrian state of Salzburg.

== Geography ==
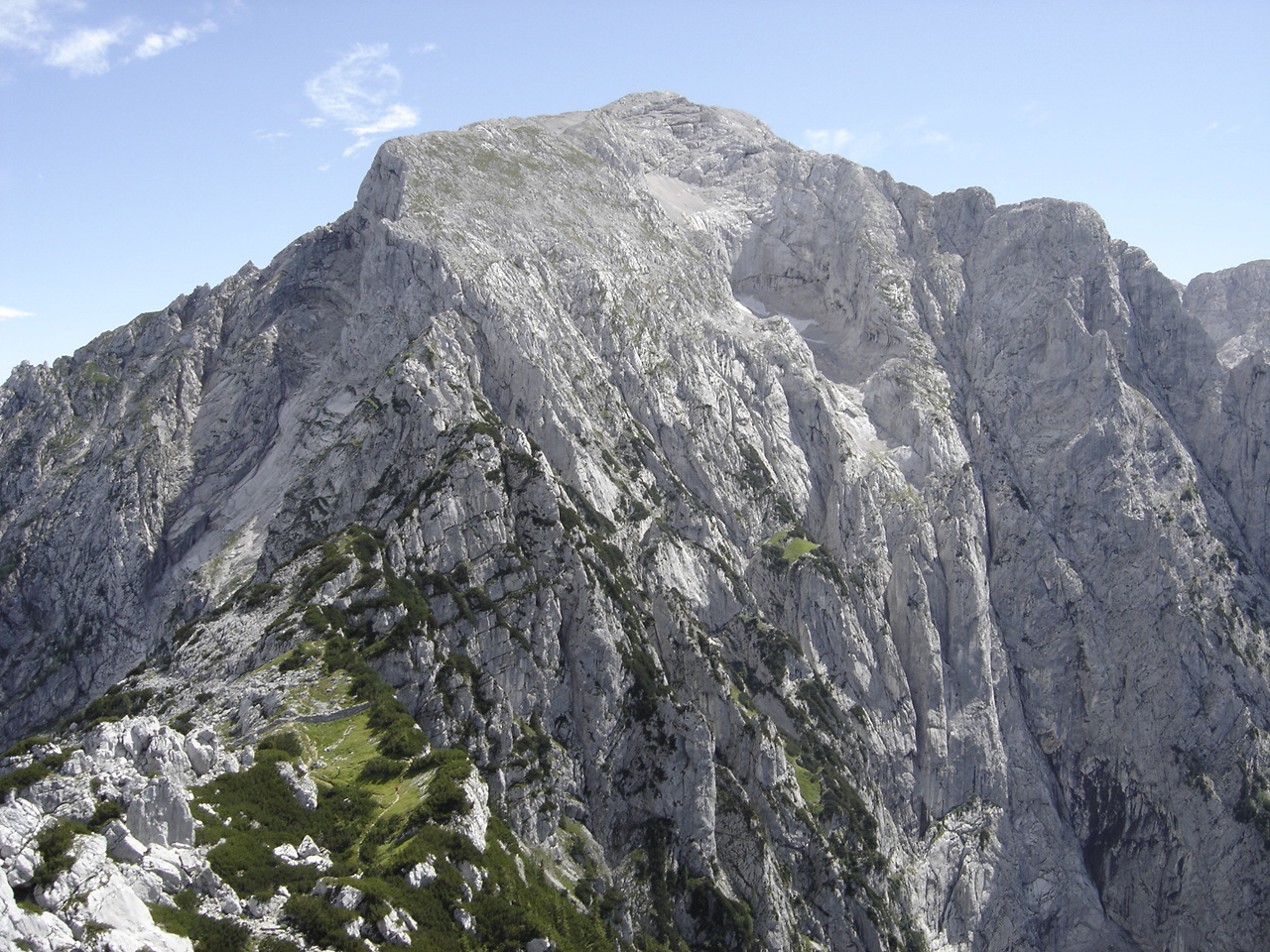
The Hoher Göll seen from the Mannlgrat ridge above the Kehlsteinhaus

On the Bavarian west side of the Hoher Göll massif, the Königssee separates it from the Watzmann, another peak in the Berchtesgaden Alps. The Königssee drains northward into the Königsseer Ache, through the Bavarian towns of Obersalzberg to the north of the Hoher Göll and Berchtesgaden to the northwest, before merging into the Berchtesgadener Ache and then the Salzach river through Salzburg further to the north.

On the Austrian east side of the massif lies the valley of the Salzach itself, flowing from south to north and merging with the west-flowing Lammer at the base of the massif, in Golling an der Salzach. A lower line of hills, to the south of the massif, lies along the German-Austrian border separating the Königssee from the Salzach.

Within the massif, Hoher Göll is linked to the north via the Mannlgrat ridge to the Kehlstein spur, a lesser peak of the massif, atop which sits the famous Kehlsteinhaus, formerly a Nazi retreat and now a tourist site. Other peaks of the massif include Hohes Brett and Jenner, both to the southwest of Hoher Göll.

== Climbing ==
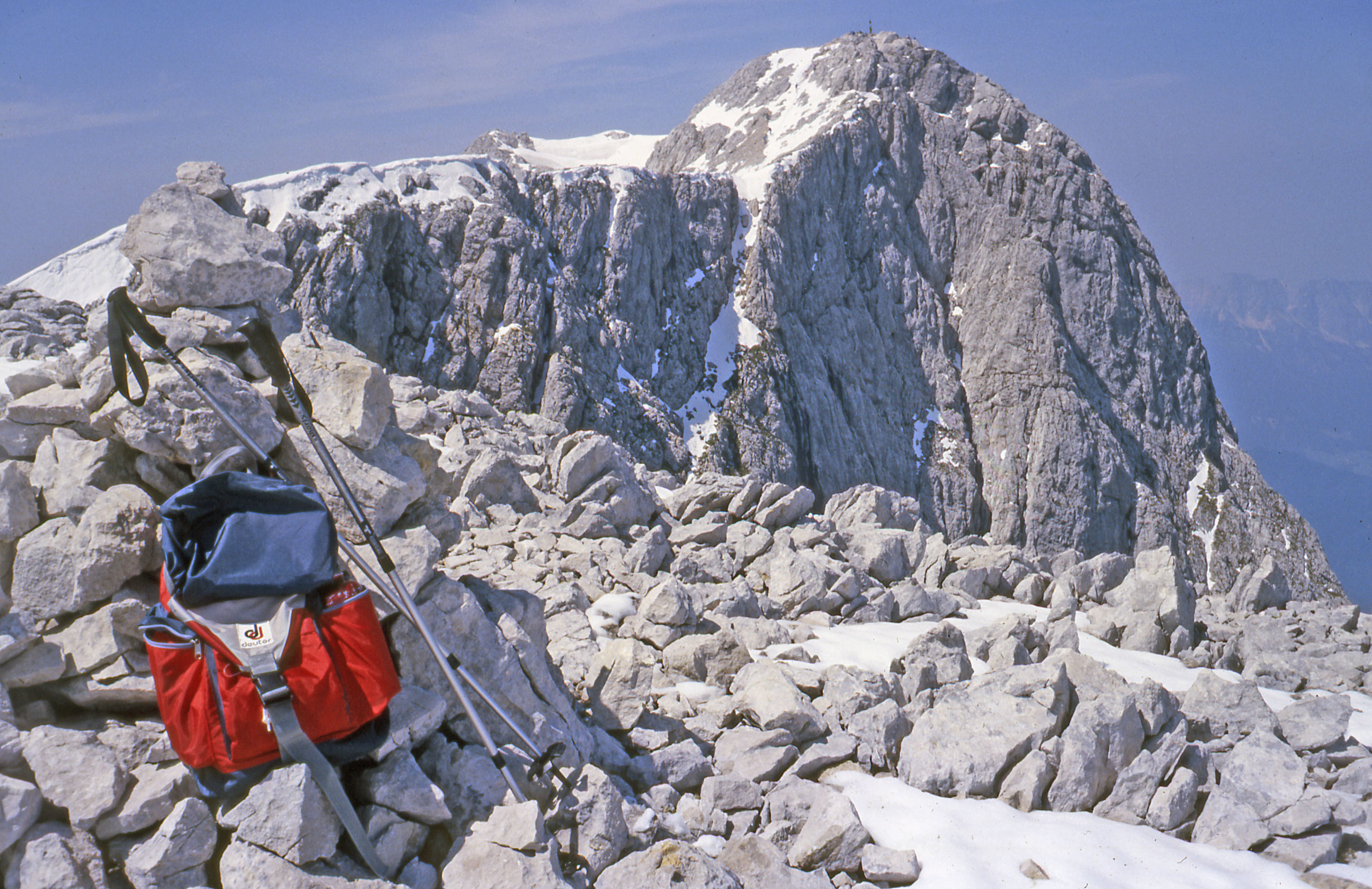
Hoher Göll summit (upper right)

The first documented ascent was made by the ordinand Valentin Stanič from Bodrež in Gorizia and Gradisca, who studied theology at the University of Salzburg and had also climbed the Watzmann peak.

A wide variety of routes lead to its summit, ranging from UIAA Grade I on a Klettersteig up the Mannlgrat ridge to UIAA Grade VIII up the West face. The Kehlsteinhaus is located on the German side, at 1,834 metres (6,017 ft). A trail leads from it to the Mannlgrat, the easiest route to the top.

Another popular round-trip ascent of the Hoher Göll is from the Purtschellerhaus mountain hut up to the summit and down to the Stahl-Haus.

The West Pillar of Hoher Göll, reached from the Endstal Valley, features sport climbing routes Scaramouche (8a, established in 1989 by Alexander and Thomas Huber and repeated in 2016 by Ines Papert) and Om (9a, established in 1992 by Alexander Huber and repeated in 2009 by Adam Ondra).
