= Würznerhorn =

Mountain in Switzerland

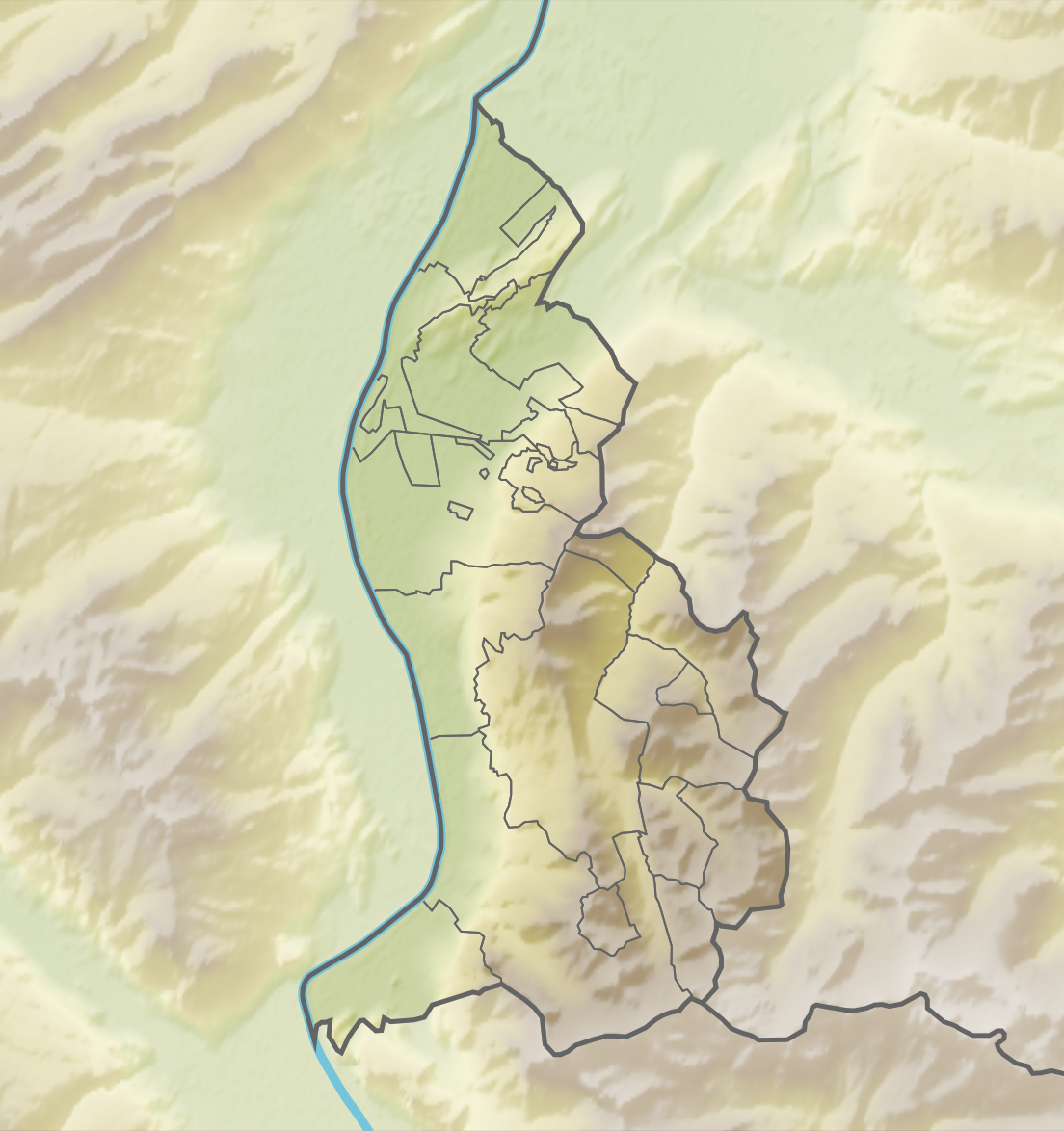
- Location within Liechtenstein

Highest point
- Elevation: 1,713 m (5,620 ft)
- Coordinates: 47°3′46″N 9°31′52″E

Geography
- Location: Liechtenstein / Switzerland
- Parent range: Rätikon, Alps

Würznerhorn is a mountain on the border of Liechtenstein and Switzerland in the Rätikon range of the Eastern Alps close to the town of Balzers, with a height of 1,713 metres (5,620 ft).

== See also ==
- Mittlerspitz
- Mittagspitz
