= Mittlerspitz =

Mountain in Switzerland

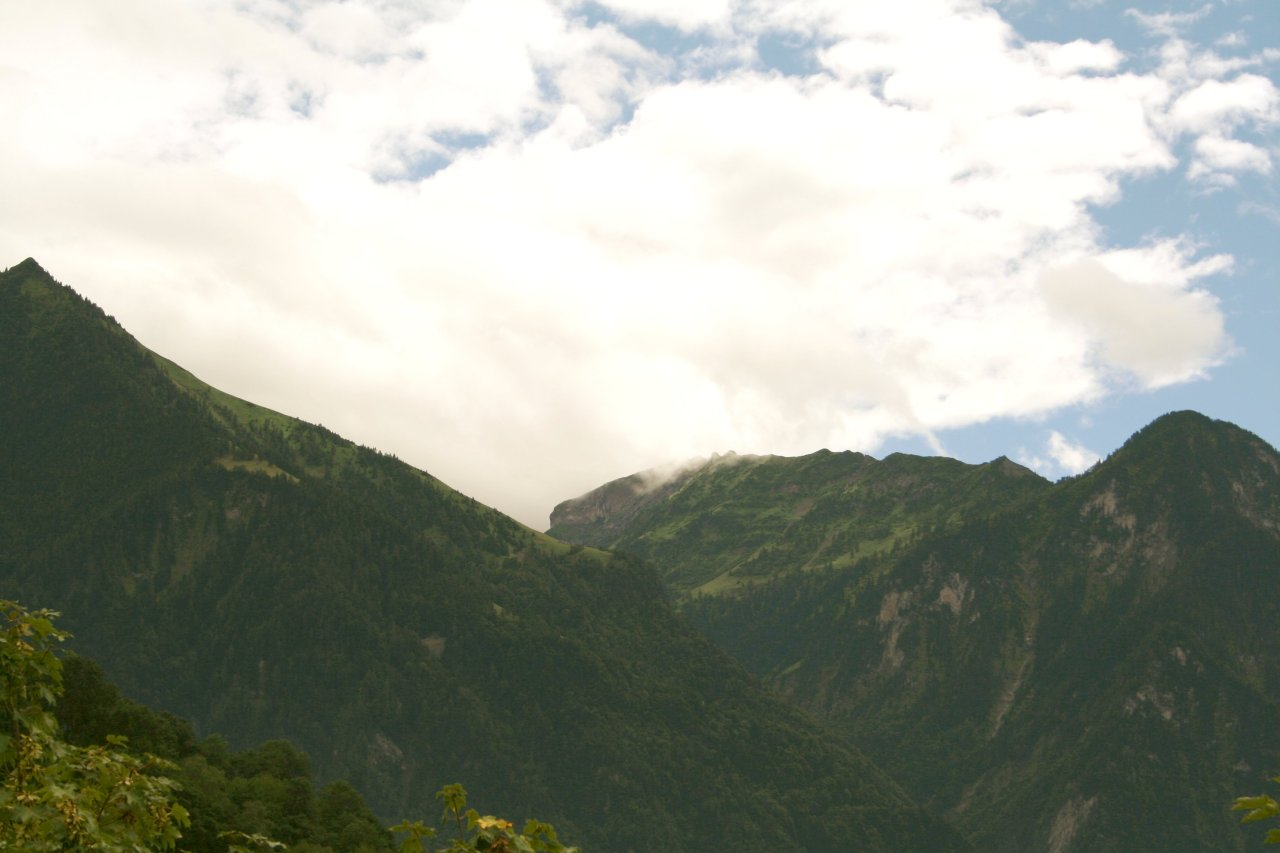
- Koraspitz, Mazorakopf and Mittlerspitz (right)

Highest point
- Elevation: 1,897 m (6,224 ft)
- Coordinates: 47°3′54″N 9°32′23″E

Geography
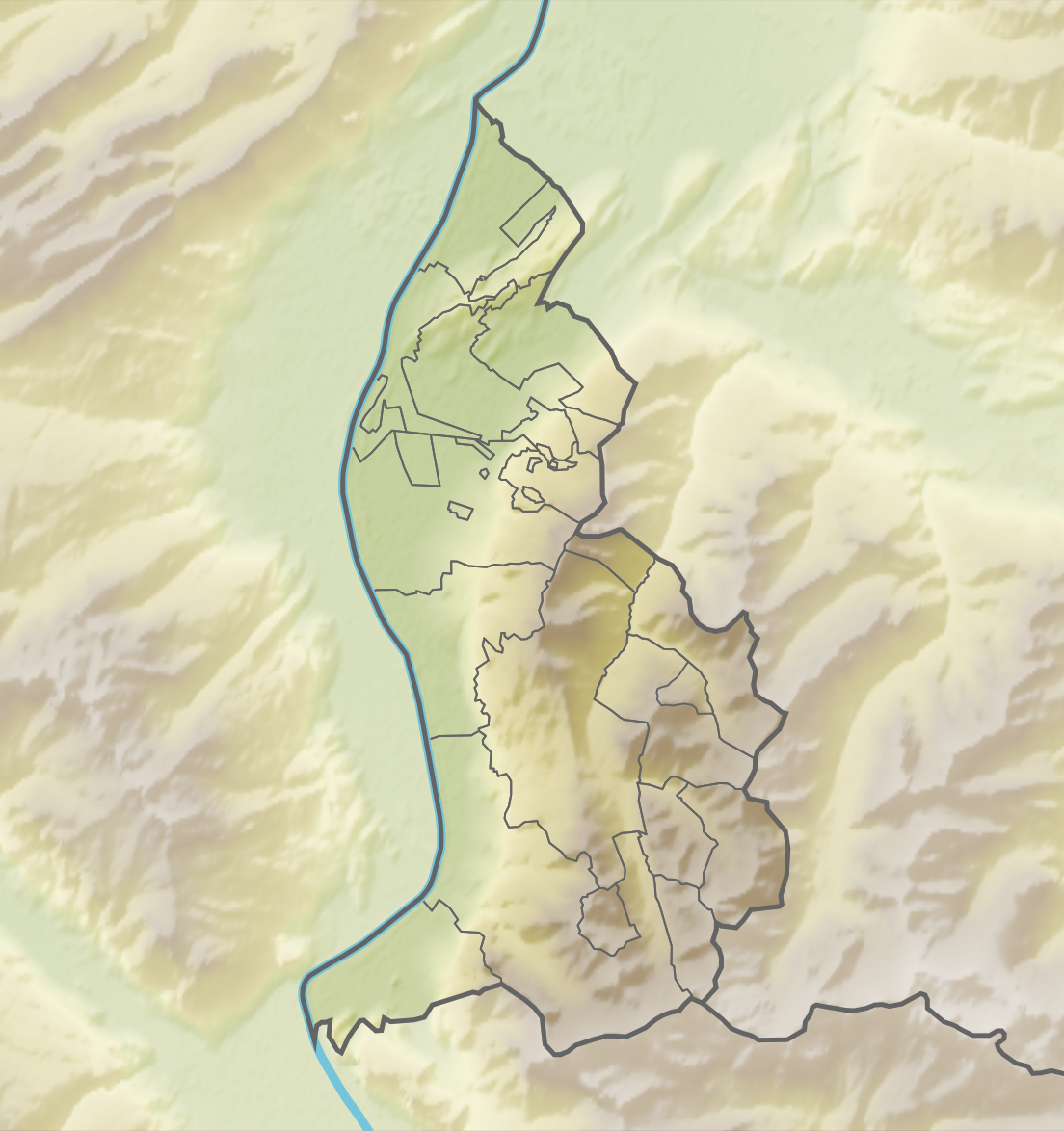
- Location within Liechtenstein
- Location: Liechtenstein / Switzerland
- Parent range: Rätikon, Alps

Mittlerspitz is a mountain on the border of Liechtenstein and Switzerland in the Rätikon range of the Eastern Alps east of the town of Balzers, with a height of 1,897 metres (6,224 ft).

== See also ==
- Würznerhorn
- Mittagspitz
