= Glegghorn =

Mountain in Switzerland

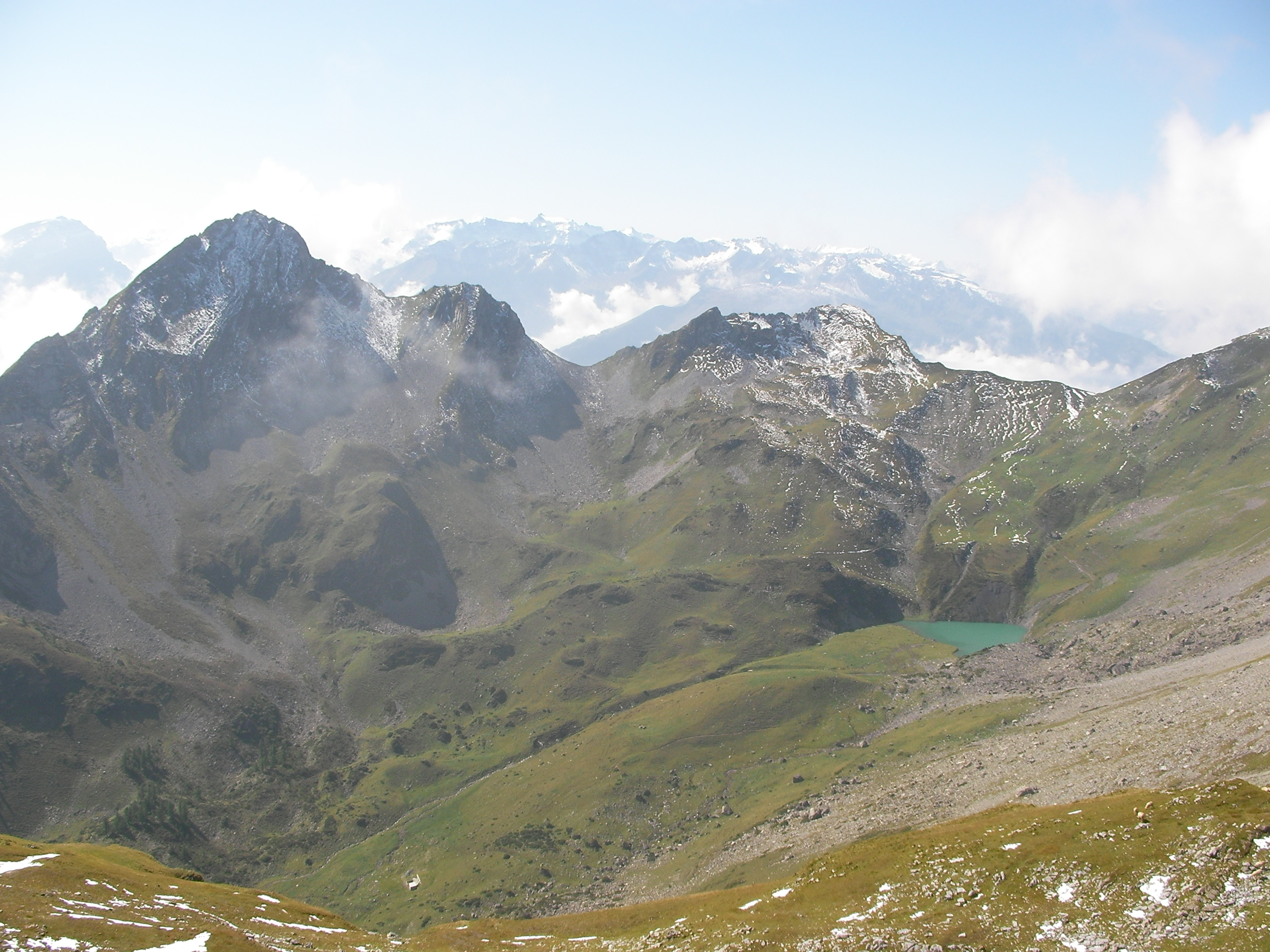
- The Glegghorn (to left of image) from the NE with the Oberst See

Highest point
- Elevation: 2,447 m (8,028 ft)
- Prominence: 205 m (673 ft)
- Parent peak: Schesaplana
- Coordinates: 47°2′10.7″N 9°34′36.4″E

Geography
- Location within Switzerland
- Location: Graubünden, Switzerland
- Parent range: Rätikon

The Glegghorn is a mountain of the Rätikon (Swiss Alps), overlooking Maienfeld in the canton of Graubünden. It lies just south of the Falknis, where runs the border with Liechtenstein.
