= Nenzinger Himmel =

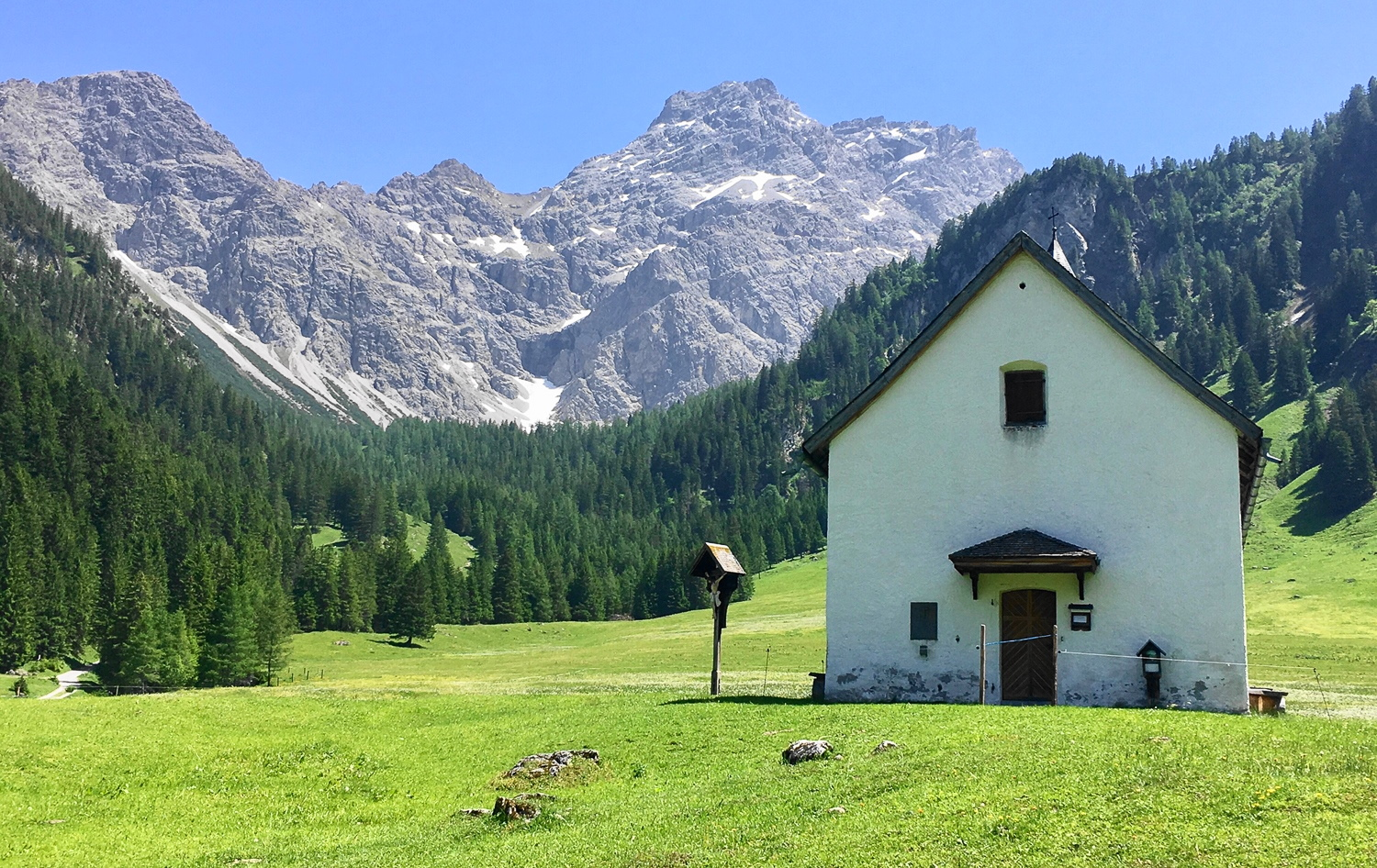
Chapel of St. Rochus (1367 m above sea level), in the background the Panüelerkopf

Nenzinger Himmel ("heaven of Nenzing") is the local name given to a collection of seasonal high-alpine settlements in the Gamperdonatal valley near the market town of Nenzing in the Austrian state of Vorarlberg. These include four alpine shielings with attached cheeseries, the valley's only Gasthaus and a number of privately owned mountain huts, often used as summer resorts.

== Geography ==
The Gamperdonatal is located in the municipality of Nenzing in the Bludenz District and is traversed by the Meng and Schalanza rivers. It is closed on three sides by the Rätikon mountain ranges, borders Liechtenstein in the west, Switzerland in the south and the Austrian Brandnertal in the east. The highest mountain peak is the Panüelerkopf with a height of 2859 m. The national borders of Austria, Liechtenstein and Switzerland meet at the summit of the Naafkopf (2570 m). The only road access is provided by a private toll road from the Austrian Montafon valley.

== History ==
Archaeological finds show that people were present in the Gamperdonatal as early as the Bronze Age (approx. 1800–800 BC) and that the pastures there have probably been used for alpine farming since that time. Hunting and alpine farming have been documented since the 15th century. The last large-scale bear hunt took place in 1782.

Due to the fertile hunting and pasture areas and the special geographical location, the Gamperdonatal was the scene of sometimes bloody clashes between local farmers and hunters, poachers, smugglers and cattle thieves, who often invaded from neighboring Swiss Grisons, until the 20th century. Numerous stories and legends bear witness to this.

Since alpine tourism slowly began to develop in Tyrol and Vorarlberg towards the end of the 19th century, the idyllically situated Gamperdonatal has also become increasingly interesting as a leisure and recreation area. In addition to the first accommodations in connection with alpine farming, hunting and customs, which are still in operation today, huts were increasingly built for recreational purposes. In the 20th century, a holiday village with over 200 huts, an inn with a hotel, a coffee house and a grocery store was created. Butter and cheese production as well as milk sales in the Senntum. Since only citizens of Nenzing are allowed to build, a large part of the tourism in the Gamperdonatal is of local origin to this day. The now official term "Nenzinger Himmel" for the settlement and the entire valley was therefore used early on. The Himmel ("sky hall" in German) name itself could be old ('arched hallway, dome').

== Electricity supply ==
The Nenzinger Himmel is without a power supply. In 1948, the French military administration installed a first small hydropower plant for soldiers' quarters as well as the Alps and dairies. In 1955, a small run-of-river power plant was put into operation. After the output fell short of the demand, an emergency generator was temporarily operated and in 1995 a second, much more powerful hydroelectric power plant powered by the Schalanza was put into operation. Both systems together provide a maximum of 108 kW. They are now reaching their limit. A maximum of 1 kW connected load is therefore allowed per hut, electrical heating and cooking devices are prohibited.
