= Vilan =

Mountain in Switzerland

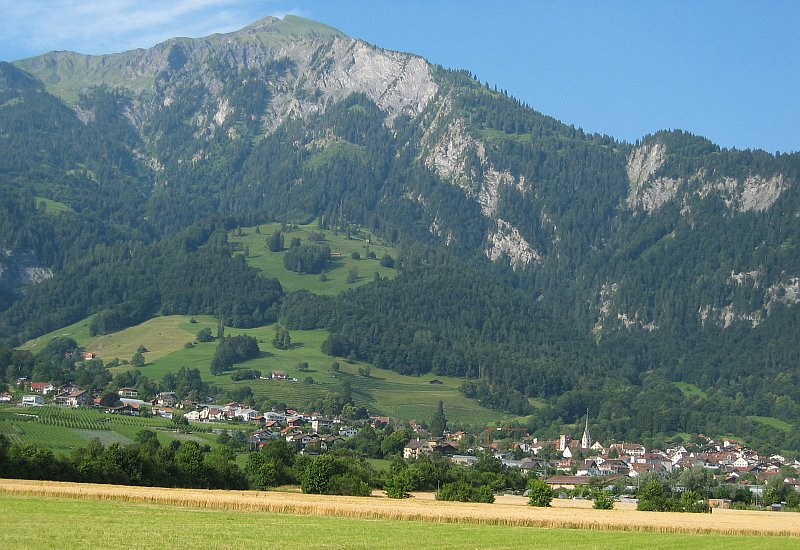

Highest point
- Elevation: 2,376 m (7,795 ft)
- Prominence: 416 m (1,365 ft)
- Coordinates: 47°0′45.7″N 9°36′11.4″E

Geography
- Location within Switzerland Location within Canton of Grisons Location within Alps
- Location: Grisons
- Country: Switzerland
- Parent range: Rätikon

The Vilan is a mountain in the Rätikon range of the Alps, located north of Malans in the Swiss canton of Grisons (Graubünden), on the border between the Landquart and Prättigau/Davos districts. It lies south of the Falknis, between the Alpine Rhine Valley and the Taschinas Valley.

== See also ==
- List of mountains of Graubünden
