= Panüelerkopf =

Mountain in the Rätikon in Vorarlberg

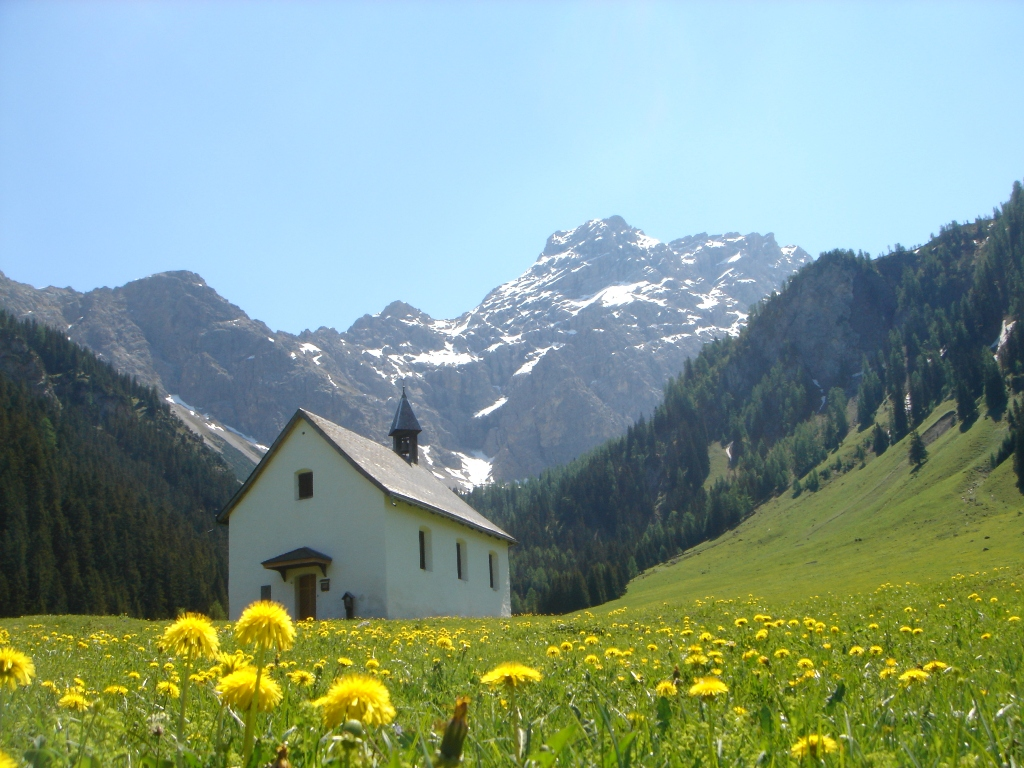
- Panüeler Kopf as seen from Nenzinger Himmel (chapel St. Rochus in front)

Highest point
- Elevation: 2,859 m (9,380 ft)
- Prominence: 143 m (469 ft)
- Coordinates: 47°04′01″N 09°40′47″E

Geography
- Location within Alps
- Location: Vorarlberg, Austria
- Parent range: Rätikon

The Panüeler Kopf (also called Panüler Kopf, Panüeler Kopf, short Panüeler or Panüler) is a mountain in the Austrian state Vorarlberg. The Panüeler Kopf is part of the Schesaplana group and with an elevation of 2,859 m (AA) the second highest mountain in the Rätikon mountain range. The 950 m high west face is the highest rock face in the Rätikon.

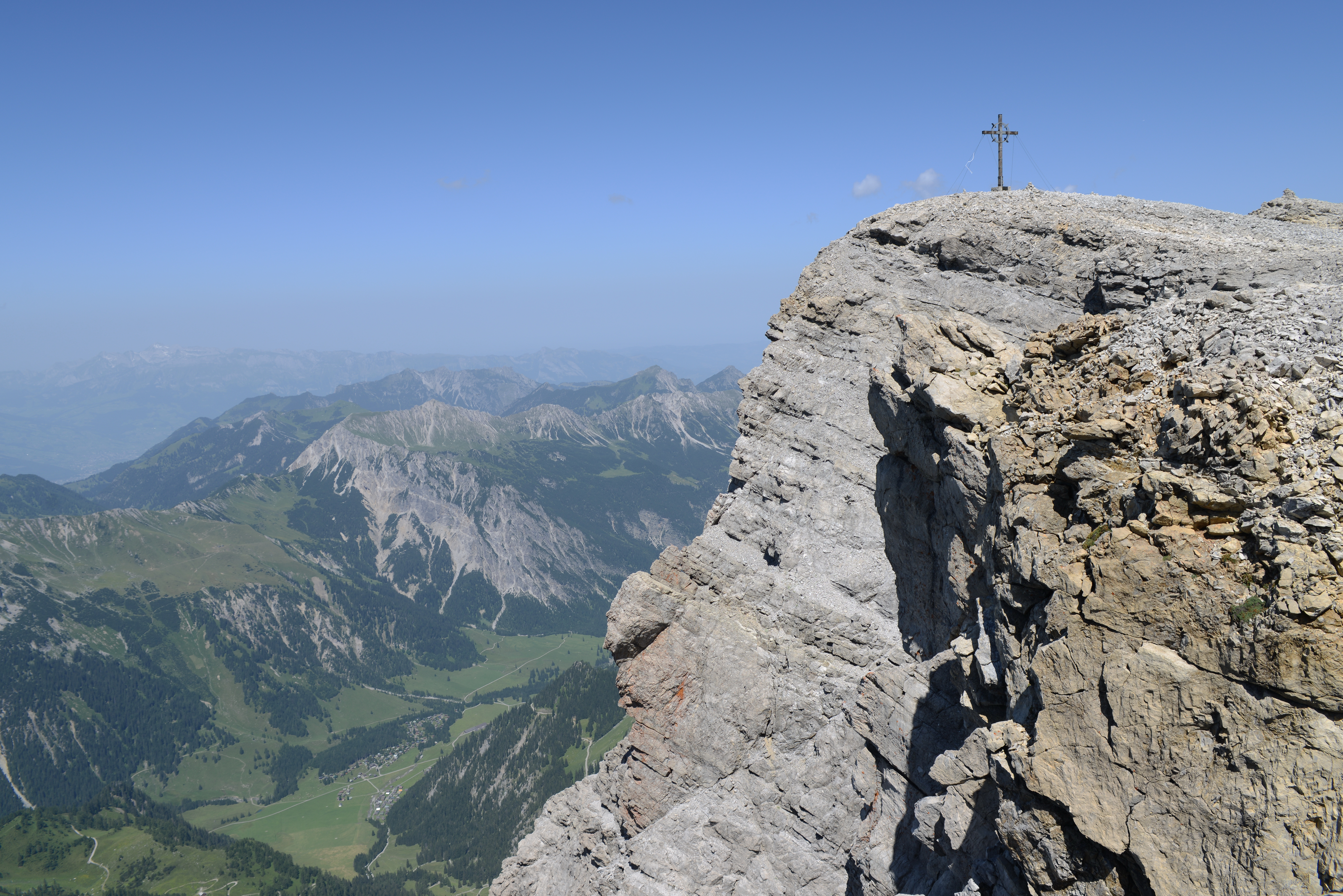
Summit of Panüeler Kopf

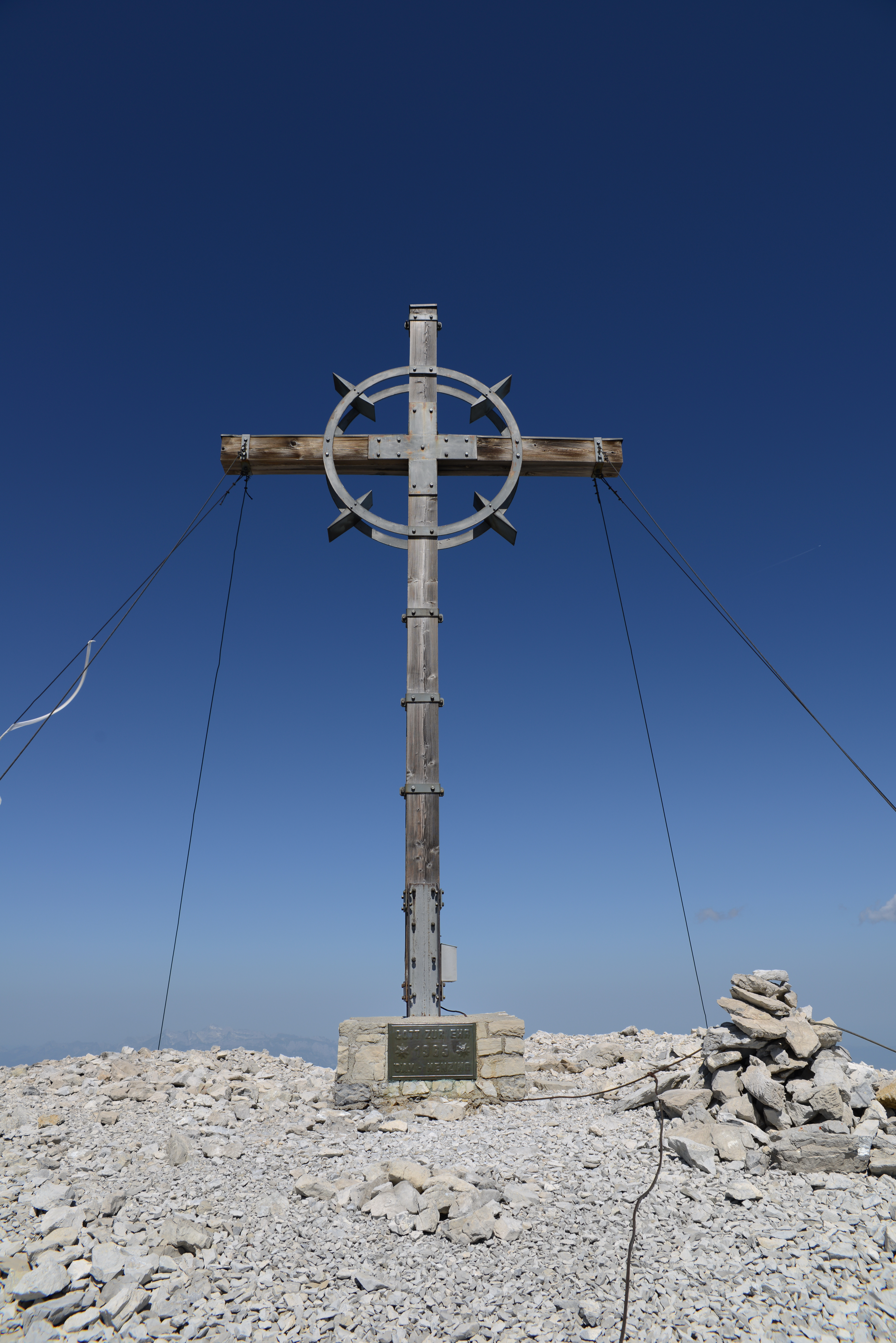
Summit cross

== Ascents ==
Ascents from alpine club huts:

- From Mannheimer Hütte in maximum one hour.
- From Oberzalimhütte via the hiking path Straußsteig in three to four hours. The Straußsteig follows the north ridge of the Panüeler Kopf.

Climbing:

- Difficulty is UIAA grade III. First ascensionists of this route were R. Jenny and F. Schatzmann in 1923.
