= Schijenflue =

Mountain in Switzerland

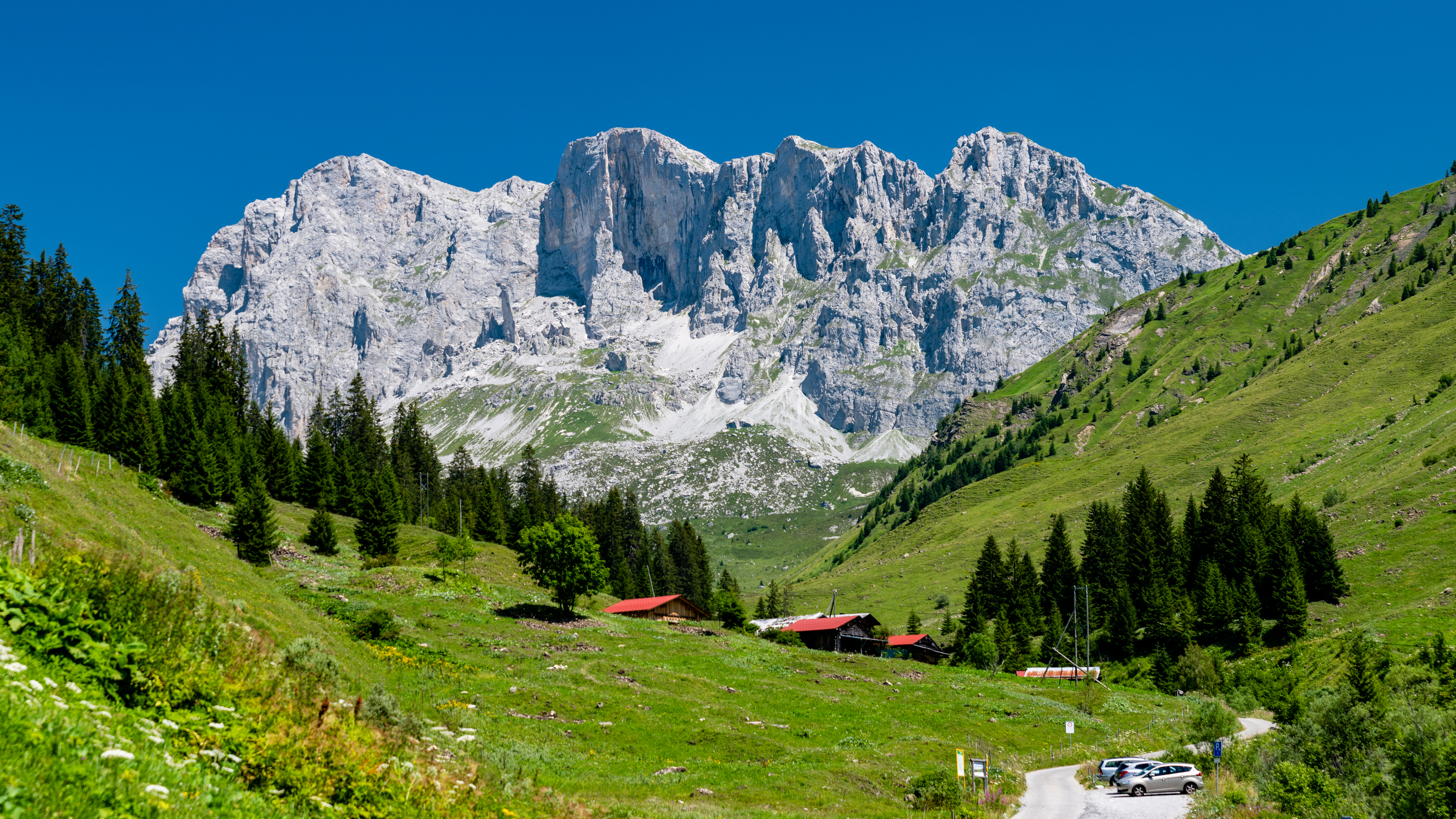
- Schijenflue southern face (centre) as seen from St. Antönien. The Wiss Platte is the left summit

Highest point
- Elevation: 2,627 m (8,619 ft)
- Prominence: 57 m (187 ft)
- Parent peak: Wiss Platte
- Coordinates: 47°0′23″N 9°52′24″E

Geography
- Location within Alps
- Location: Graubünden, Switzerland; Vorarlberg, Austria
- Parent range: Rätikon

The Schijenflue is a mountain in the Rätikon range of the Alps, located on the border between Austria and Switzerland.

A day or multiday hike that follows the whole of the Rätikon chain and passes Schijenflue on its sunny side is called "Prättigauer Höhenweg".
