= Wildberg (Rätikon) =

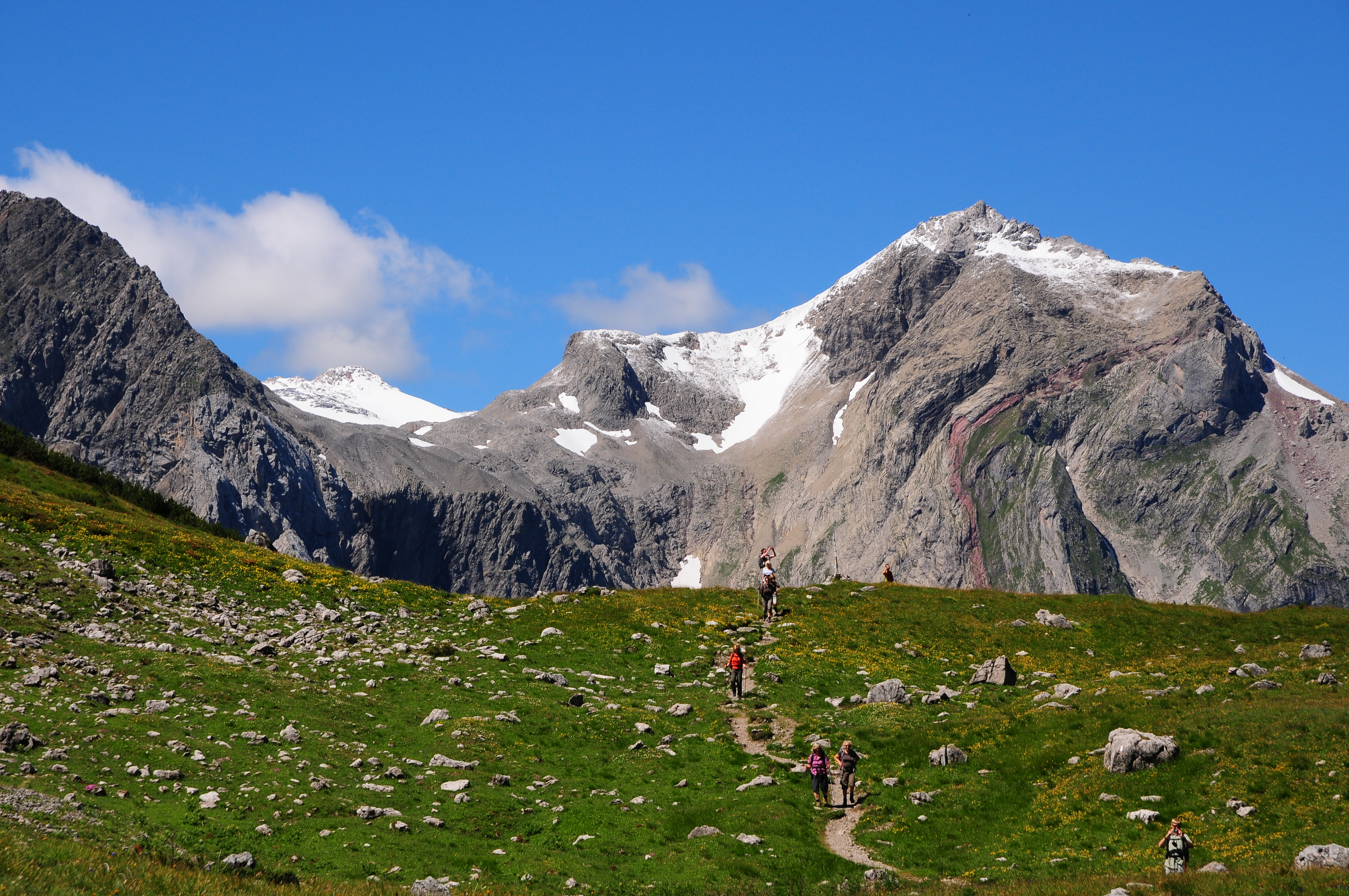
- Wildberg as seen from Saulajoch (2065 m)

Highest point
- Elevation: 2,788 m (9,147 ft)
- Prominence: 143 m (469 ft)
- Coordinates: 47°04′05″N 09°42′03″E

Geography
- Location within Alps
- Location: Vorarlberg, Austria
- Parent range: Schesaplana group, Rätikon

Climbing
- Normal route: via Mannheimer Hütte

The Wildberg (Austrian German pronunciation: [ˈvɪldbɛrɡ]) is a 2,788 m (AA) high mountain in the Schesaplana group of the Rätikon mountain range in the Austrian state Vorarlberg.

== Ascents ==
- From the alpine club hut Mannheimer Hütte in 20 to 30 minutes.
- From Mottakopf (2176 m) via the north ridge; UIAA grade III. First ascentionists of this route were E. A. Wehrlin and A. Beck in 1886.
