= Sassauna =

Mountain in Switzerland

- Location within Switzerland

Highest point
- Elevation: 2,308 m (7,572 ft)
- Prominence: 123 m (404 ft)
- Parent peak: Girenspitz
- Coordinates: 47°0′43.2″N 9°41′52.6″E

Geography
- Location: Graubünden, Switzerland
- Parent range: Rätikon

The Sassauna is a mountain in the Rätikon range of the Alps, overlooking Schiers in the Swiss canton of Graubünden.
