= Drei Türme =

Peaks in the Alps on the Austrian-Swiss border

- Drei Drusentürme
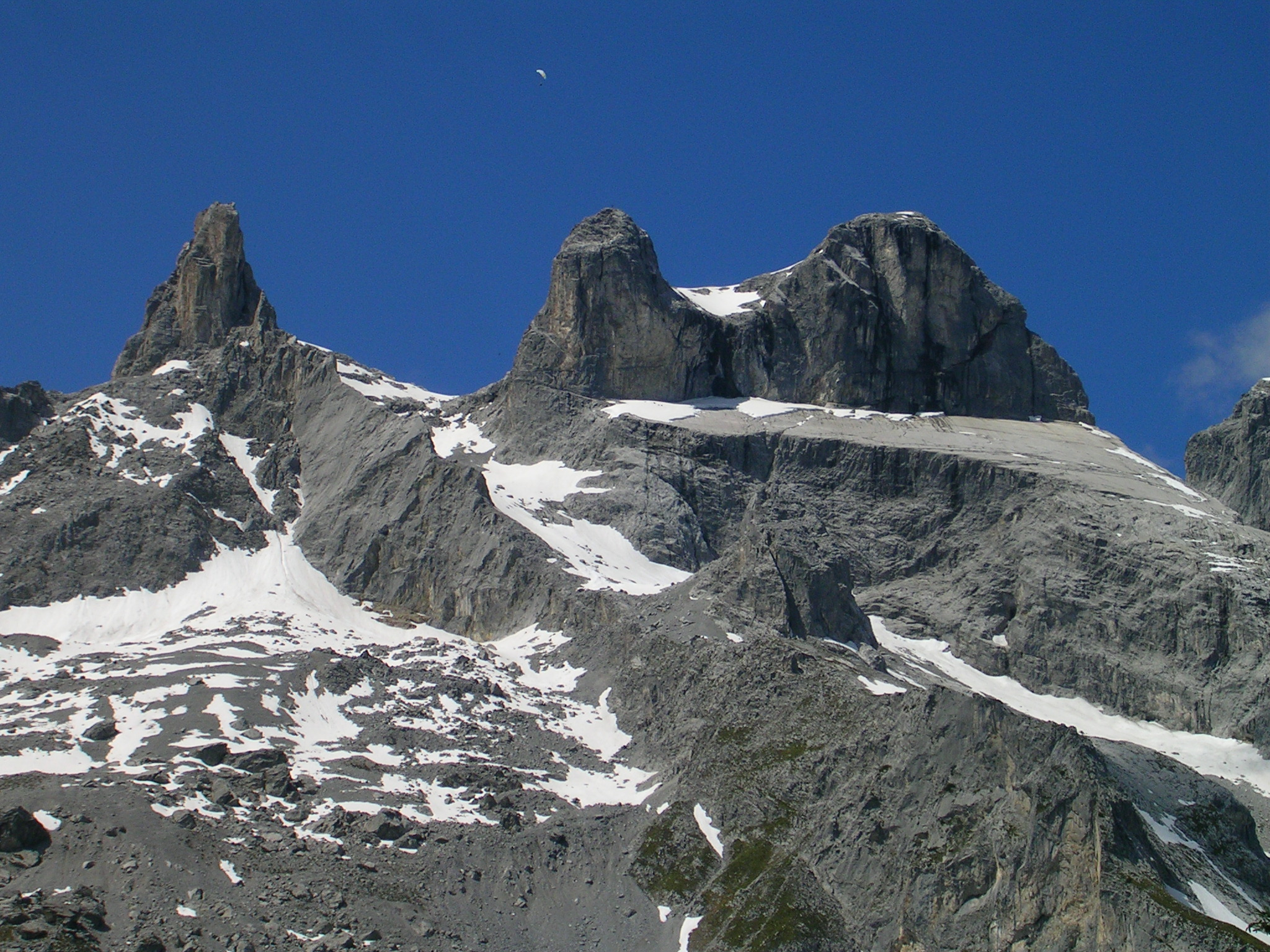

Highest point
- Elevation: 2,830 m (9,280 ft)
- Prominence: 628 m (2,060 ft)
- Parent peak: Piz Kesch
- Coordinates: 47°01′29″N 9°48′36″E

Geography
- Location within Alps
- Location: Vorarlberg, Austria (massif partially in Switzerland)
- Parent range: Rätikon

The Drei Türme (also Dri Türm or Drei Drusentürme; "three towers") are a group of peaks in the Rätikon range of the Alps on the border between Austria and Switzerland. The highest of the three, the Grosser Turm, is on the Austrian side of the border in the state of Vorarlberg. It is the highest point of the Drusenfluh group.
