= Wiss Platte =

Mountain in Switzerland

- Weissplatte
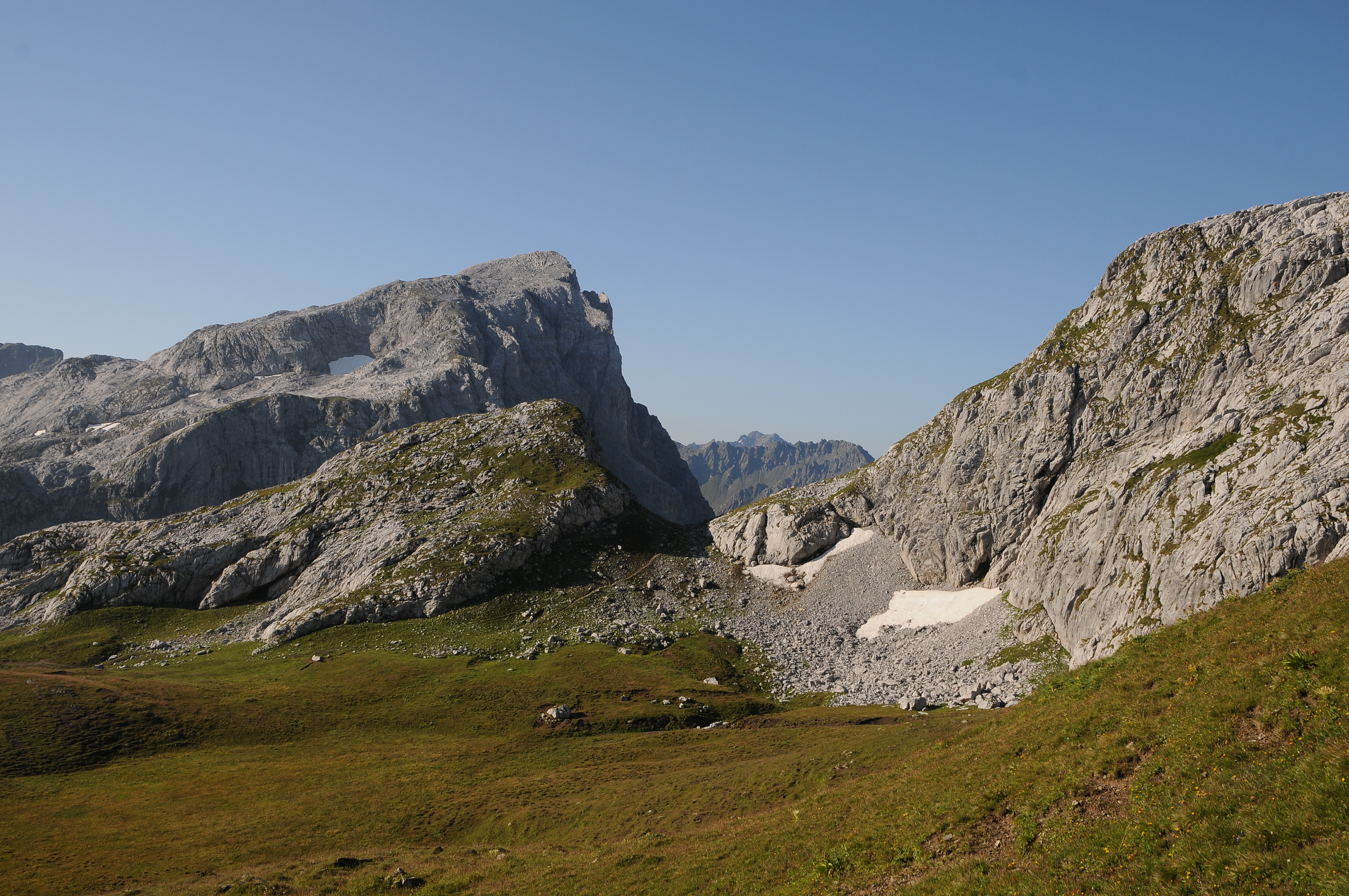
- The north side

Highest point
- Elevation: 2,628 m (8,622 ft)
- Prominence: 283 m (928 ft)
- Parent peak: Madrisa
- Coordinates: 47°00′34″N 9°52′16″E

Geography
- Location within Alps
- Location: Graubünden, Switzerland; Vorarlberg, Austria
- Parent range: Rätikon

The Wiss Platte (also known as Weissplatte or Weißplatte) is a mountain in the Rätikon range of the Alps, located on the border between Austria and Switzerland. It lies between Schruns (Vorarlberg) and St. Antönien (Graubünden).

== Geology ==
The Sulzfluh limestone forming the upper slopes of the Wiss Platte is Tithonian in age. The limestone was deposited in shallow water.
