= Rätschenhorn =

Mountain in Switzerland

- Rätschenflue
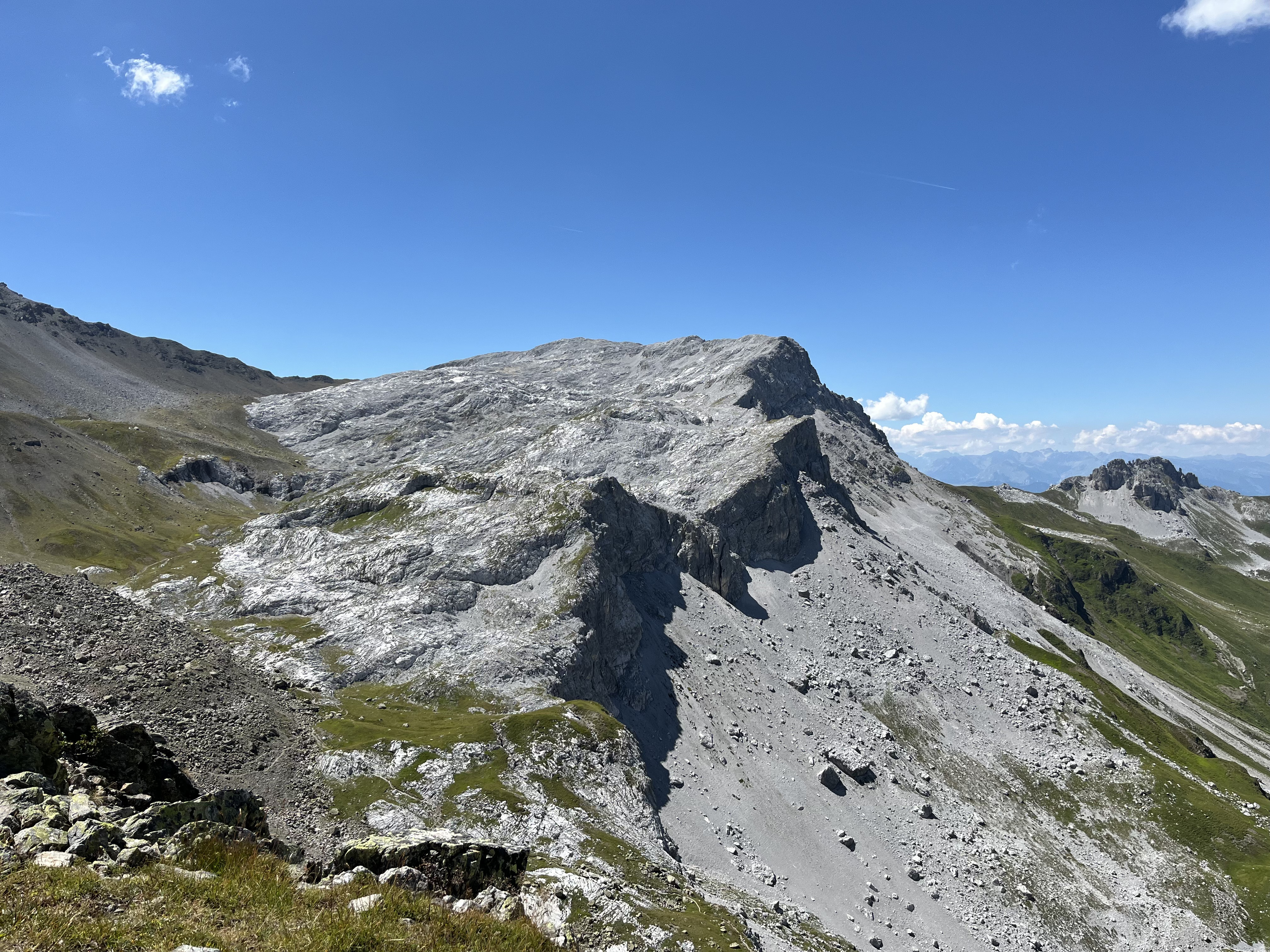
- Rätschenfluh from Gafierjoch on the border of Switzerland with Austria in August 2022

Highest point
- Elevation: 2,703 m (8,868 ft)
- Prominence: 101 m (331 ft)
- Parent peak: Madrisa
- Coordinates: 46°56′12″N 9°51′0.9″E

Geography
- Location within Switzerland
- Location: Graubünden, Switzerland
- Parent range: Rätikon

The Rätschenhorn (also known as Rätschenflue) is a mountain in the Rätikon range of the Alps, overlooking St. Antönien in the canton of Graubünden. It is located west of the Madrisa.
