= Girenspitz =

Mountain in Switzerland

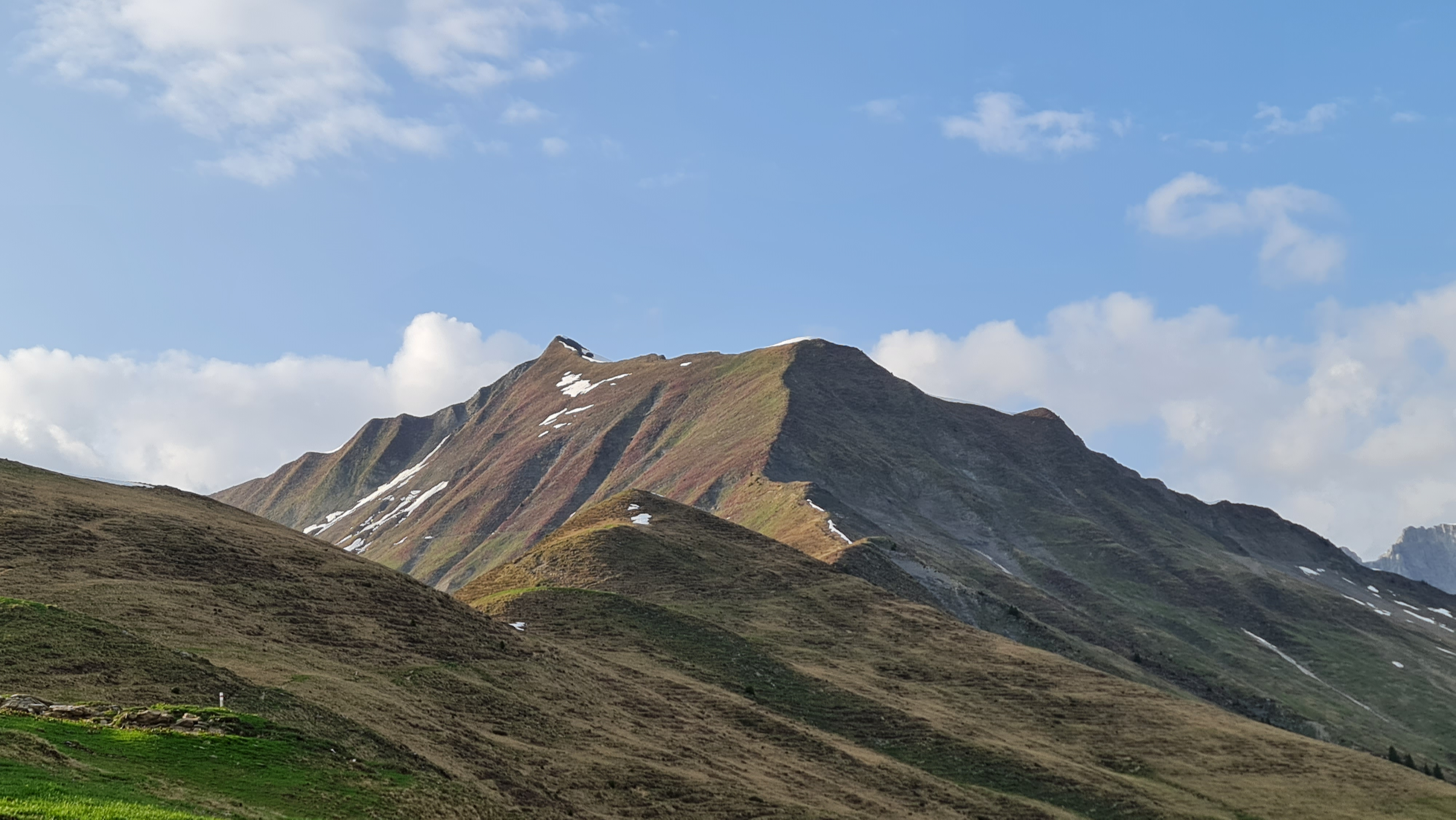

Highest point
- Elevation: 2,394 m (7,854 ft)
- Prominence: 266 m (873 ft)
- Coordinates: 47°1′35″N 9°44′36″E

Geography
- Location within Switzerland Location within Canton of Grisons
- Location: Schiers
- Country: Switzerland
- Canton: Grisons
- Parent range: Rätikon

The Girenspitz (2,394 m / 7,854 ft) is a mountain in the Rätikon range of the Alps, located north of Schiers in the Swiss canton of Grisons (Graubünden). It is the culminating poing of the group lying between the valleys of the Taschinasbach and the Schraubach.

== See also ==
- List of mountains of Graubünden
- Swiss Alps
