= Naafkopf =

Mountain in Switzerland

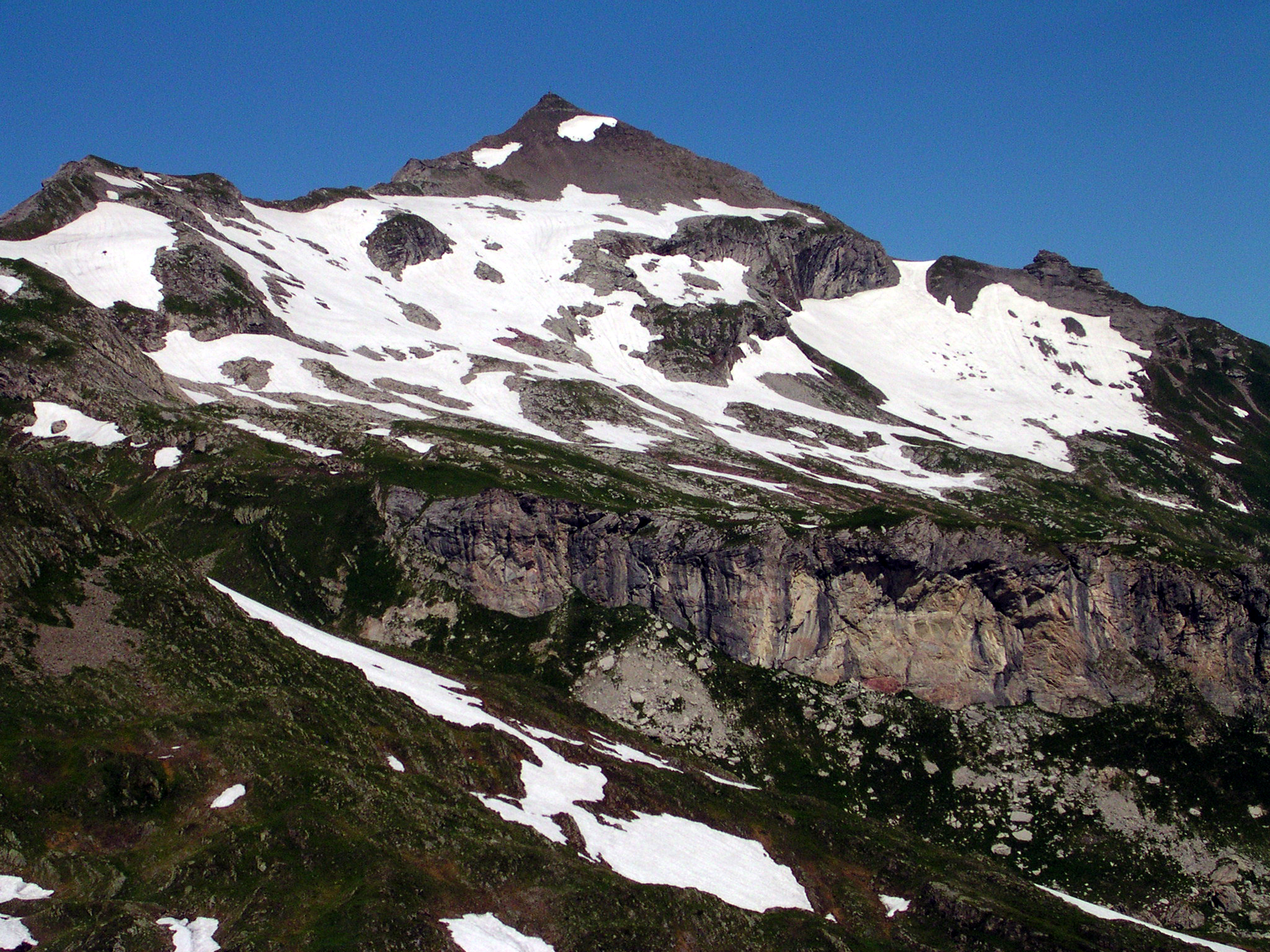
- From East

Highest point
- Elevation: 2,570 m (8,430 ft)
- Prominence: 223 m (732 ft)
- Parent peak: Grauspitz
- Coordinates: 47°03′38.54″N 9°36′25.75″E

Geography
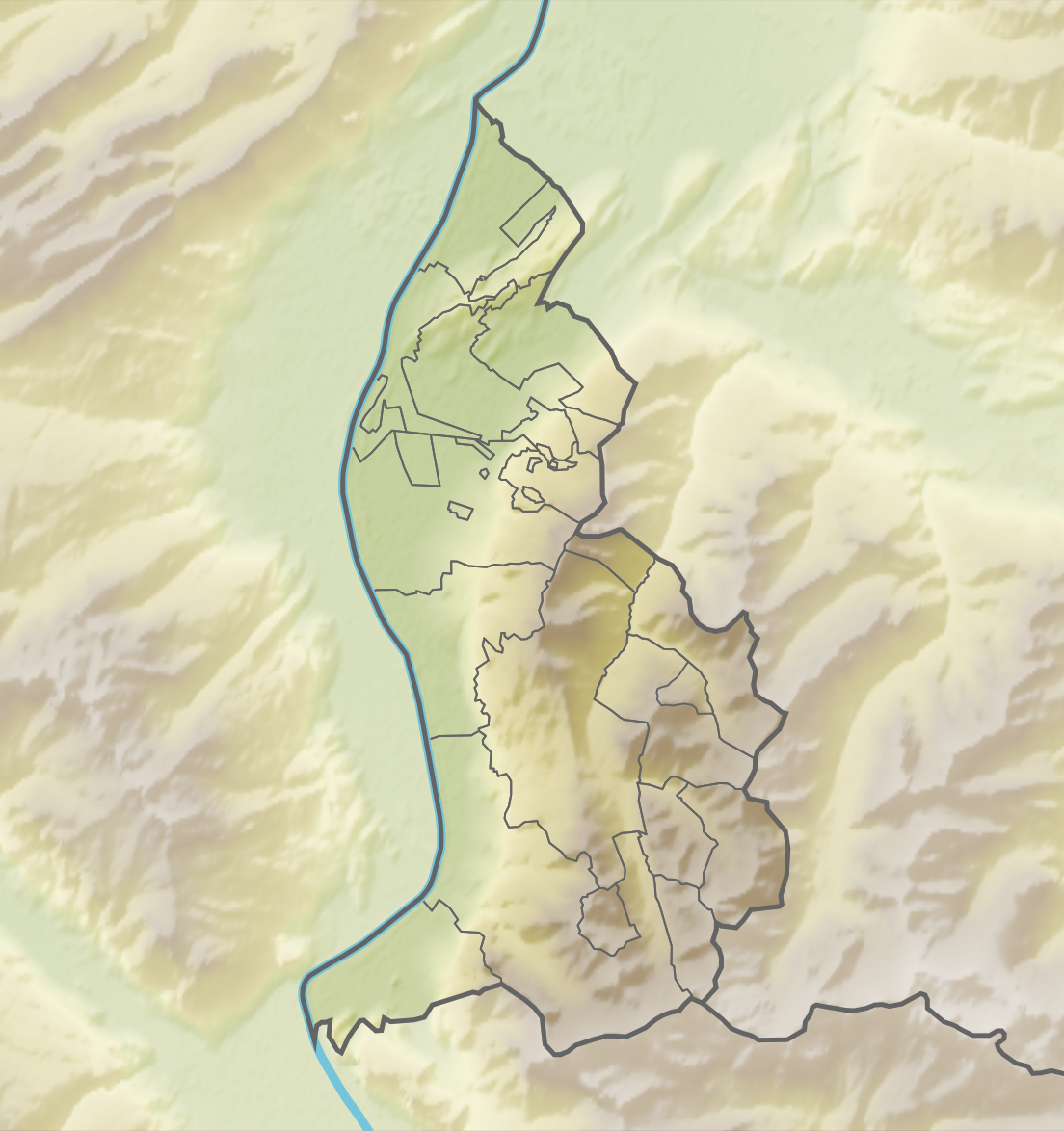
- Location within Liechtenstein
- Location: Graubünden, Switzerland; Vorarlberg, Austria; Schaan, Liechtenstein
- Parent range: Rätikon

The Naafkopf is a mountain in the Rätikon range of the Alps, located at the border between Austria, Liechtenstein and Switzerland. The summit tripoint is marked with a large wooden cross supported on a brick base extending in three directions.

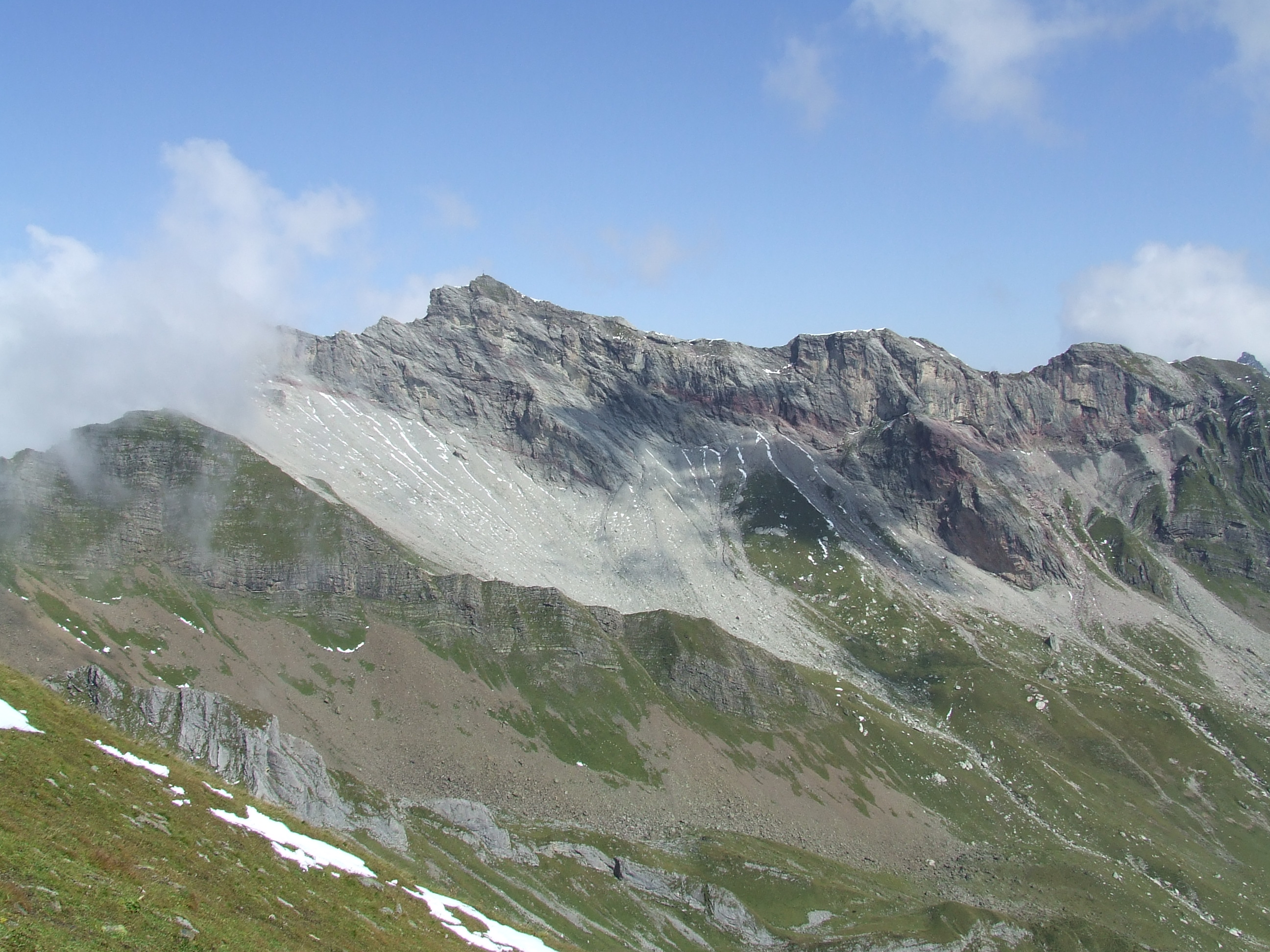
Naafkopf and the ridge above Ijes
