= Zimba (mountain) =

Mountain in the Rätikon in Vorarlberg

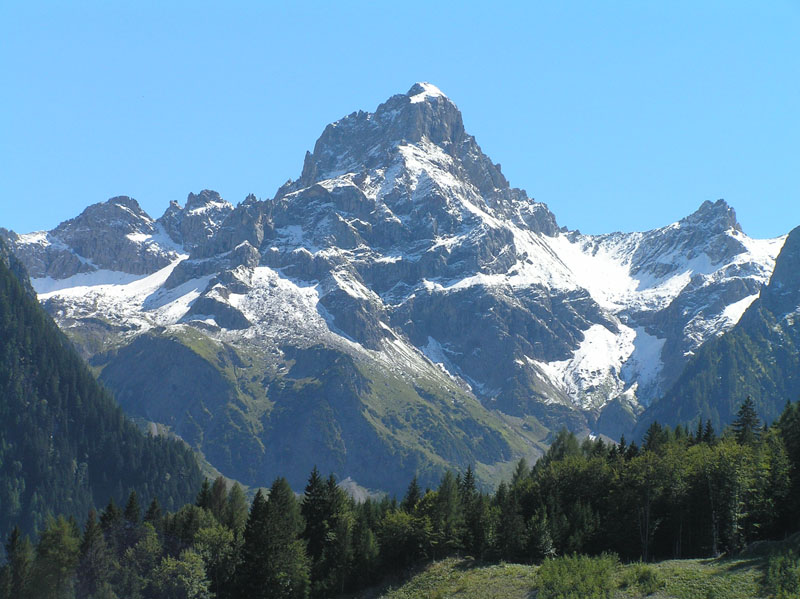

Highest point
- Elevation: 2,645 m (8,678 ft)
- Prominence: 579 m (1,900 ft)
- Listing: Alpine mountains 2500-2999 m
- Coordinates: 47°05′30″N 9°47′24″E

Geography
- Location within Austria
- Location: Vorarlberg, Austria
- Parent range: Rätikon (Alps)

Climbing
- First ascent: 8 September 1848 by Anton Neier from Bludenz

The Zimba, elevation 2,645 m (8,678 ft), is the most familiar mountain in the Austrian mountain range called Rätikon. Located in the hinterland of Bludenz, this horn is the landmark of Montafon valley and especially of the main village of Schruns. Three ridges and three walls emphasize the shapeliness of the form. The eastern ridge is one of the most familiar climbing routes of the whole Rätikon range, but the normal way leads along the western ridge. Despite the altitude of just 2,645 m, the Zimba is a great viewpoint for the entire region.

== Climbing routes ==
- Western ridge, normal way, UIAA Class 3 (Opened by F. Sohm and J. Both in 1900)
- North east ridge, seldom taken, Class 2. (August 1854 route by three hunters)
- East ridge, the most difficult way up, Class 4
- South wall, dangerous (grassy and falling rocks), Class 2. (First ascent route)
