= Drusenfluh =

Mountain in Switzerland

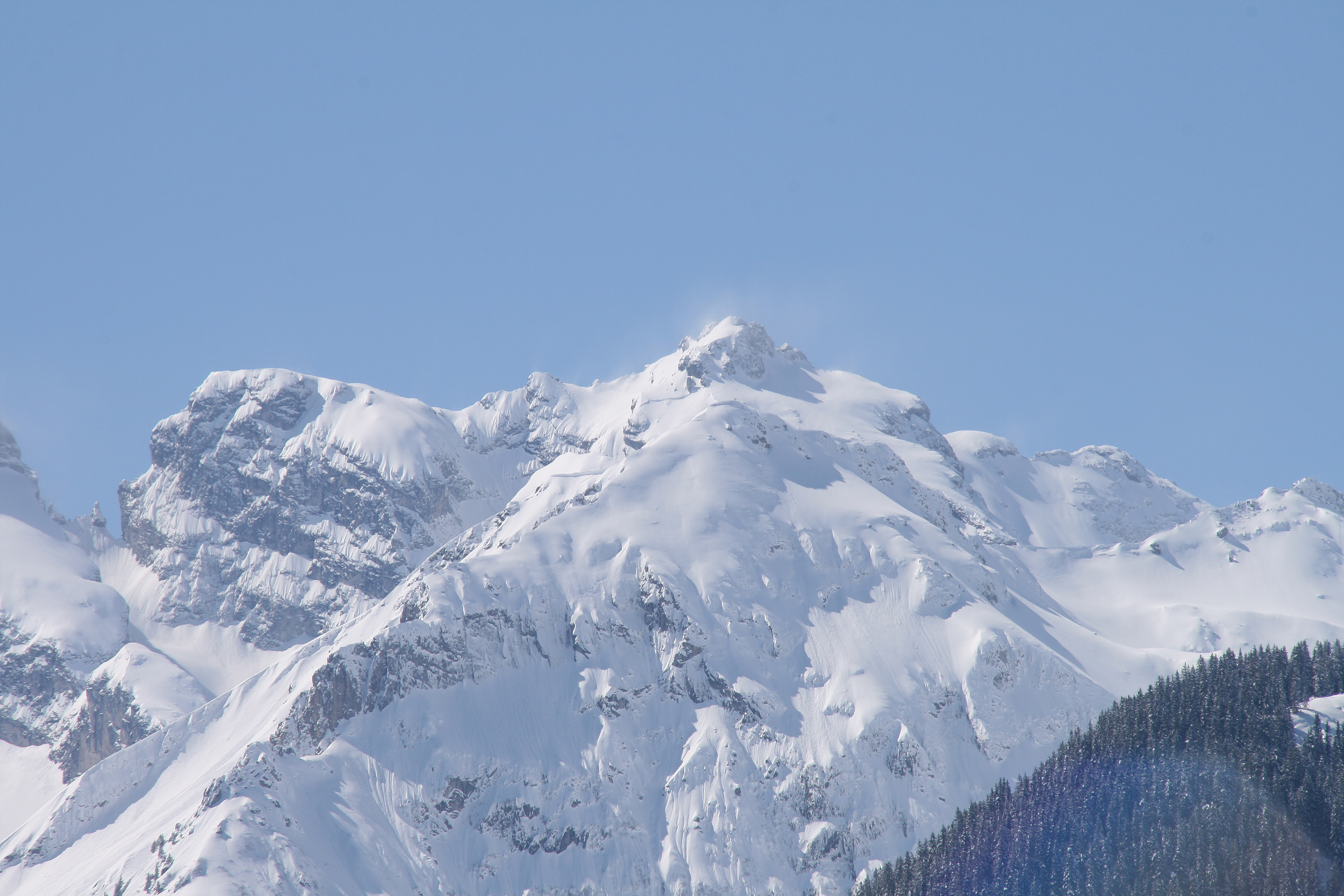
- The north side

Highest point
- Elevation: 2,827 m (9,275 ft)
- Prominence: 190 m (620 ft)
- Parent peak: Drei Türme
- Coordinates: 47°01′44.3″N 9°48′5.5″E

Geography
- Location within Alps
- Location: Graubünden, Switzerland; Vorarlberg, Austria
- Parent range: Rätikon

Climbing
- First ascent: Christian Zudrell 14th of August 1870

The Drusenfluh is a mountain in the Rätikon range of the Alps, located on the border between Austria and Switzerland. According to the Swisstopo map, the mountain both includes the 2827 m Drusenfluh on the border and the three peaks named the Drei Türme ("Three Towers"), the highest of which (2830 m) is north of the main ridge on the Austrian site. The Drusenfluh and Drei Türme are separated by the 2637 m Eisjöchl.

After Christian Zudrell's first ascent, it took 18 years before a second ascent was successful. This second tour ended all doubts about the first ascent as the two mountaineers, Karl Blodig and Eugen Sohm, encountered a rock on the peak of the mountain, that had the signs "C Z 70" engraved, the "visiting card" that Zudrell had left on the peak. This piece of rock was brought to the Lindauer Hütte in 1995 to protect it, as weather and lightnings had destroyed it more and more.

There are several routes for climbers mainly in the sheer drops of the southern face (which is the Graubünden side on Swiss territory.) From the Austrian side, one of the Drei Türme can be reached via a mountain path from the Lindauer Hut (Swiss grade T4, signposted white and blue).

The multi-day hike "Prättigauer Höhenweg" passes south of the mountain.
