= Madrisa =

Mountain in Switzerland

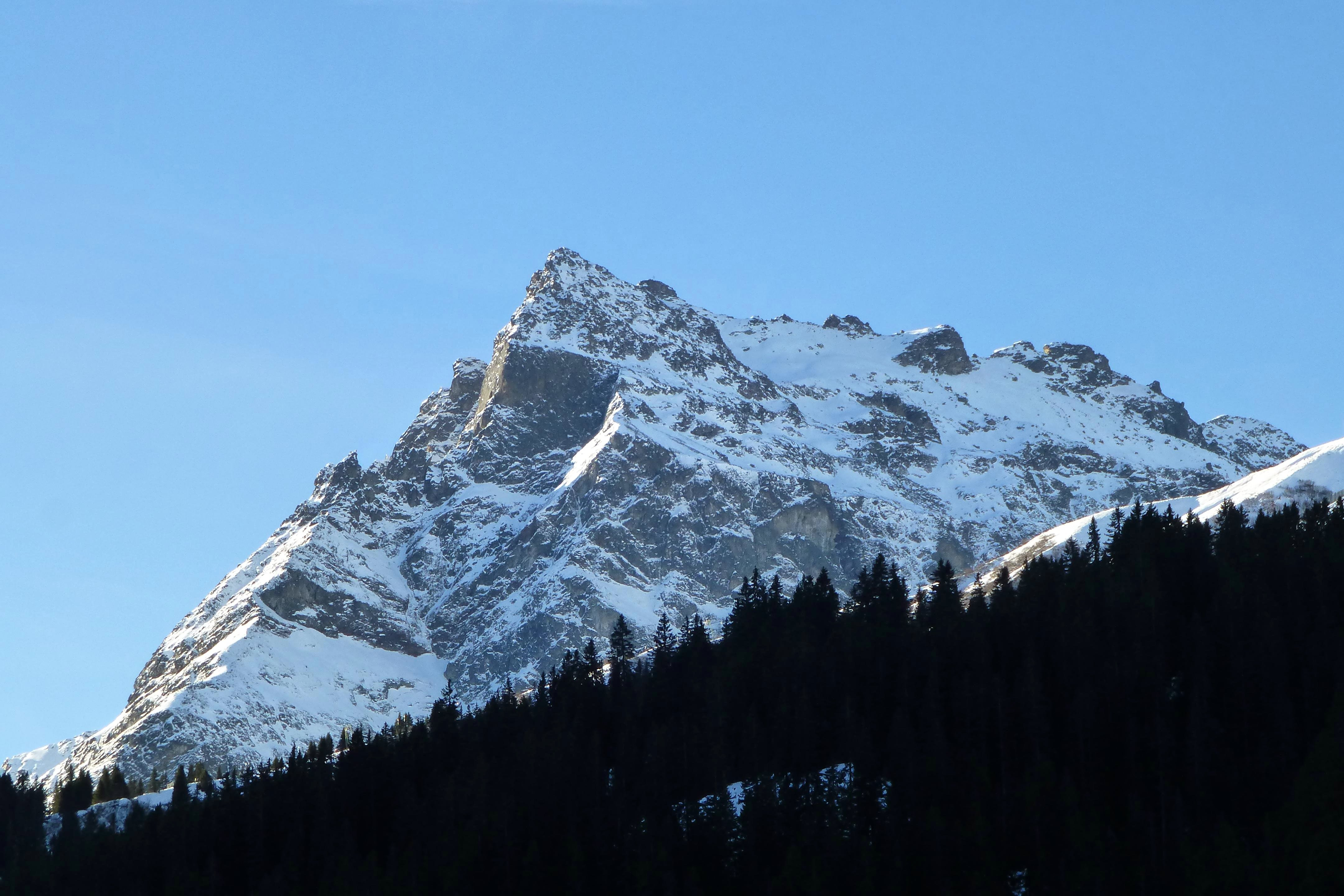

Highest point
- Elevation: 2,826 m (9,272 ft)
- Prominence: 600 m (2,000 ft)
- Parent peak: Drusenfluh
- Coordinates: 46°55′51.9″N 09°52′19.6″E

Geography
- Location within Switzerland
- Location: Graubünden, Switzerland
- Parent range: Rätikon

The Madrisa (or Madrisahorn) is a mountain in the Rätikon mountain range, overlooking Klosters in the Swiss canton of Graubünden. Its summit (2,826 metres) is located near the Austrian border.

The Madrisa is constituted by several secondary summits, notably the Gargeller Madrisa (2,770 metres), overlooking Gargellen in Austria.

Ski lifts up to 2,600 metres are located on the Klosters side.
