= Falknis =

Mountain in Switzerland

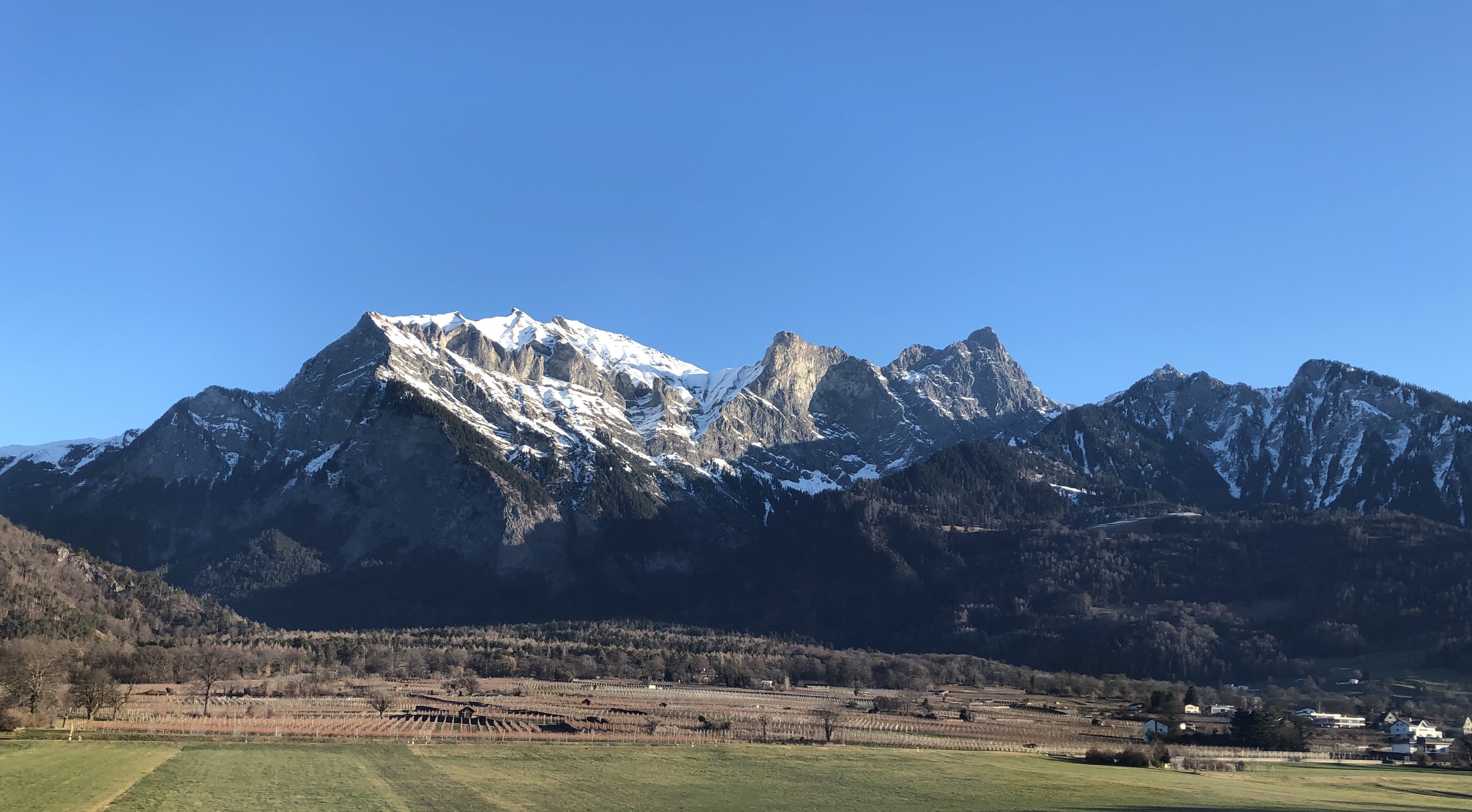
- Photographed from Sargans, Switzerland

Highest point
- Elevation: 2,562 m (8,406 ft)
- Prominence: 60 m (200 ft)
- Parent peak: Grauspitz
- Coordinates: 47°03′01.9″N 9°33′52.3″E

Geography
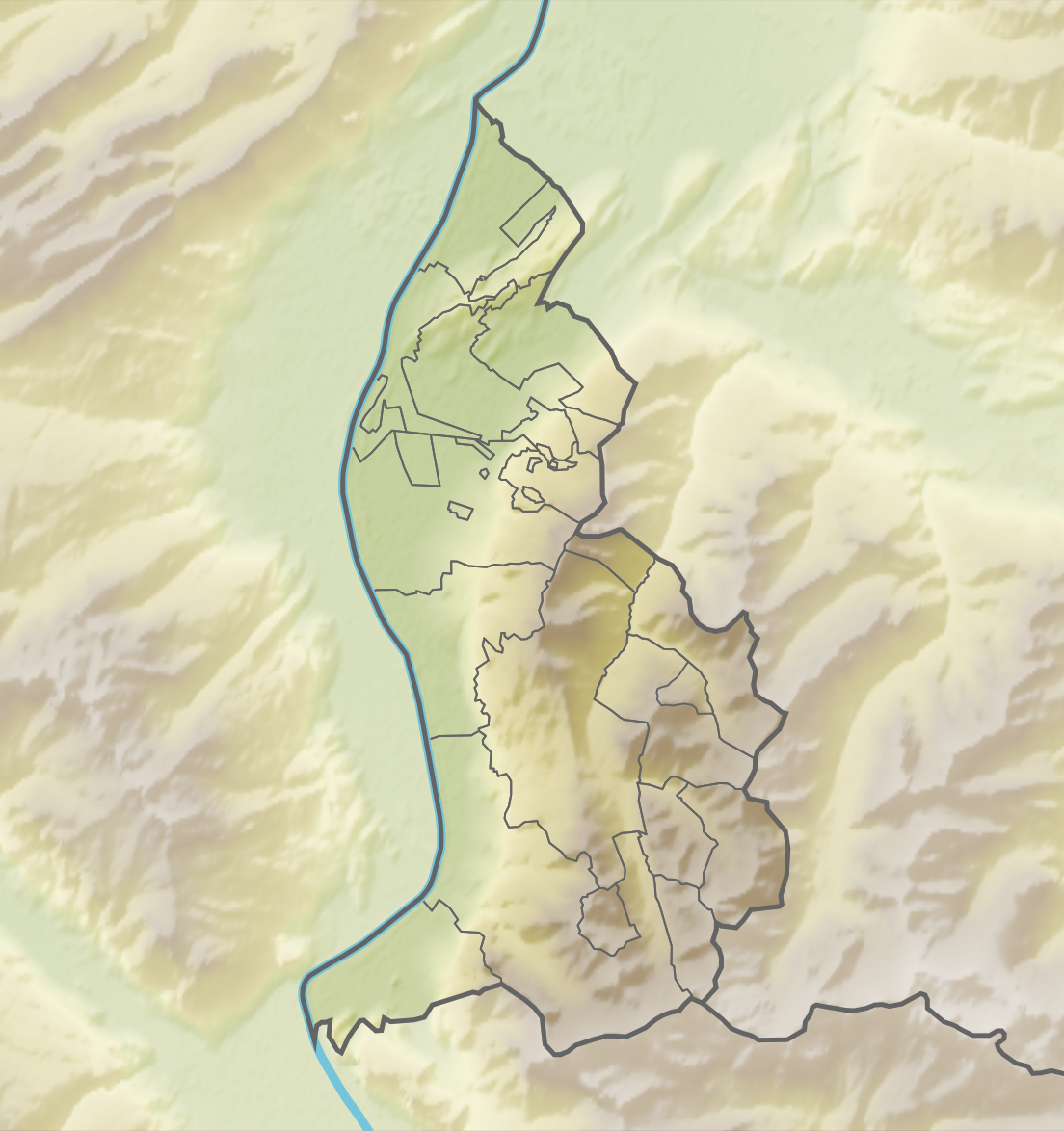
- Location within Alps Location within Liechtenstein Location within Switzerland
- Location: Triesen, Liechtenstein; Landquart, Grisons, Switzerland
- Parent range: Rätikon

The Falknis is a mountain in the Rätikon range of the Eastern Alps, located on the border between Liechtenstein and Switzerland (Grisons). It is 2,562 metres (8,406 ft) at its highest peak.

The nearest locality is Balzers, Liechtenstein, in the Alpine Rhine Valley.

== In literature ==
The Falknis is one of two mountains named in Johanna Spyri's 1881 novel Heidi. The title character describes them to her grandfather after having seen them both from the meadow where the goats are taken daily to graze, and he tells her their names. The other mountain is the Schesaplana, some 11 kilometres (6.8 mi) away to the east.
