= Mittagspitz =

Mountain in Liechtenstein

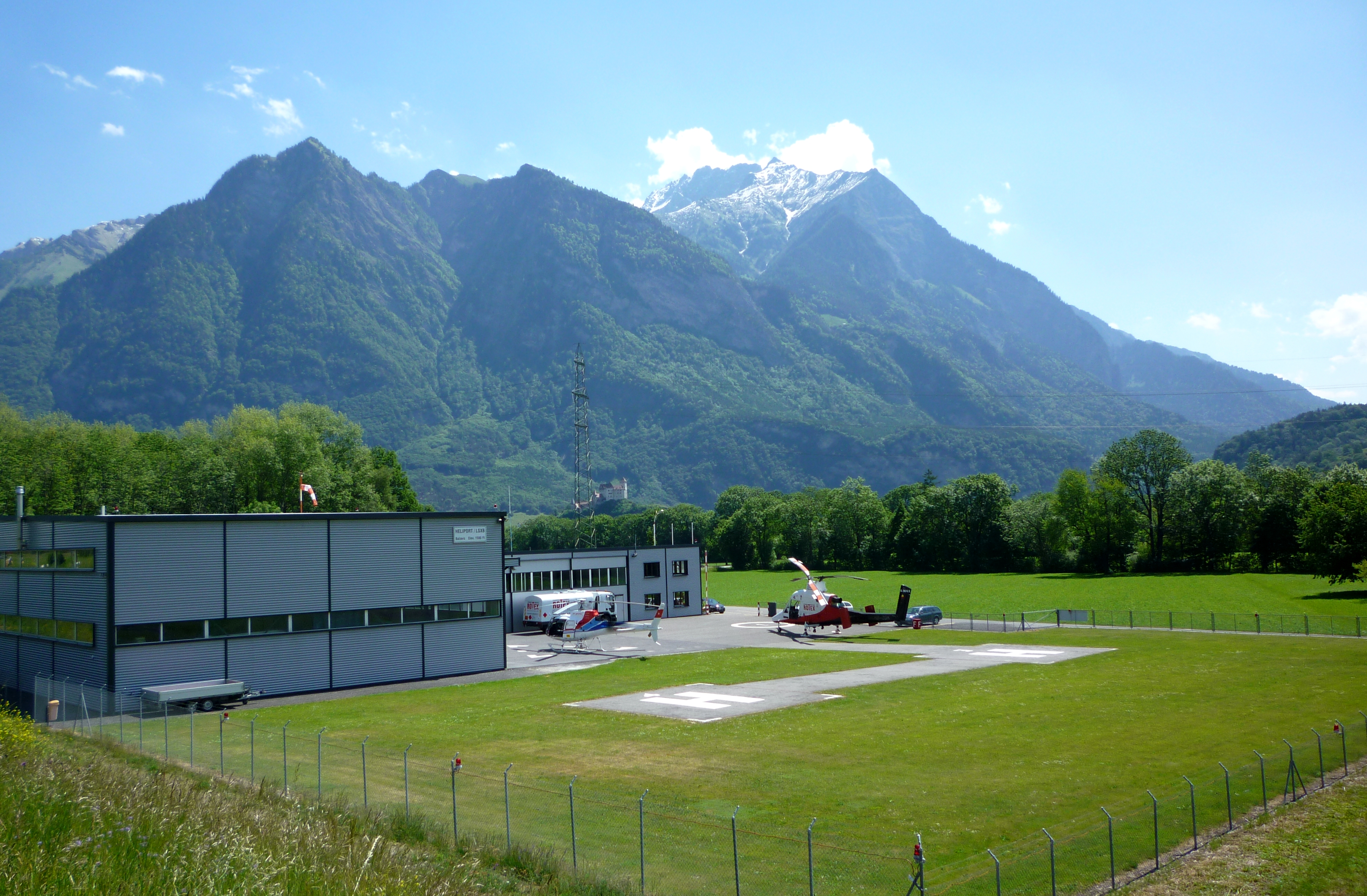
- Mittagspitz (first peak on left)

Highest point
- Elevation: 1,857 m (6,093 ft)
- Coordinates: 47°4′9″N 9°32′3″E

Geography
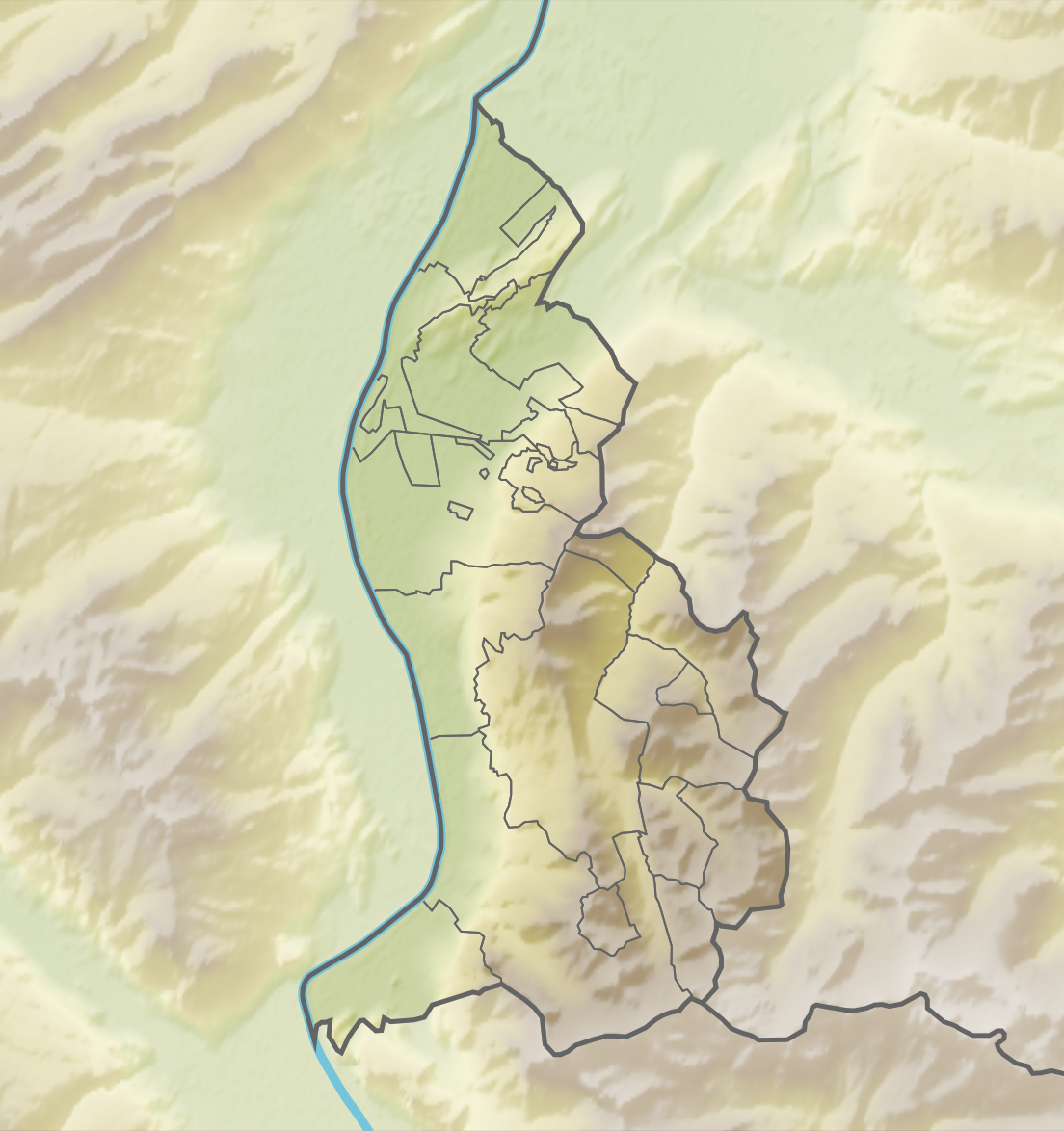
- Location within Liechtenstein
- Location: Liechtenstein
- Parent range: Rätikon, Alps

Mittagspitz is a mountain in Liechtenstein, close to the border with Switzerland in the Rätikon range of the Eastern Alps, east of the town of Balzers, with a height of 1,857 metres (6,093 ft).

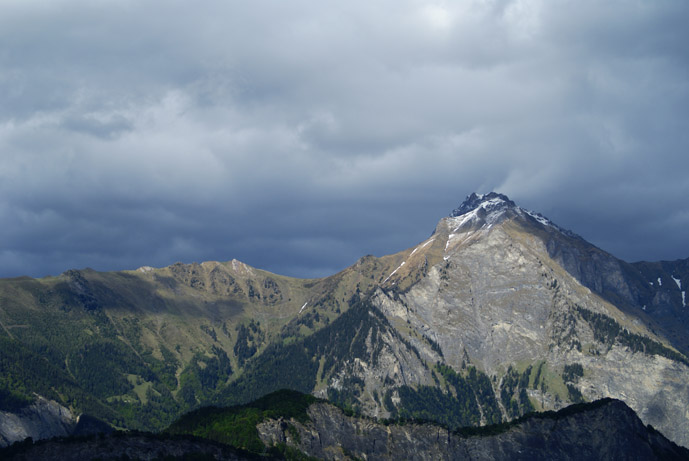
Mittagspitz (left of ridge near band of trees) and Falknishorn (right)
