= Grauspitz =

Mountain in Switzerland

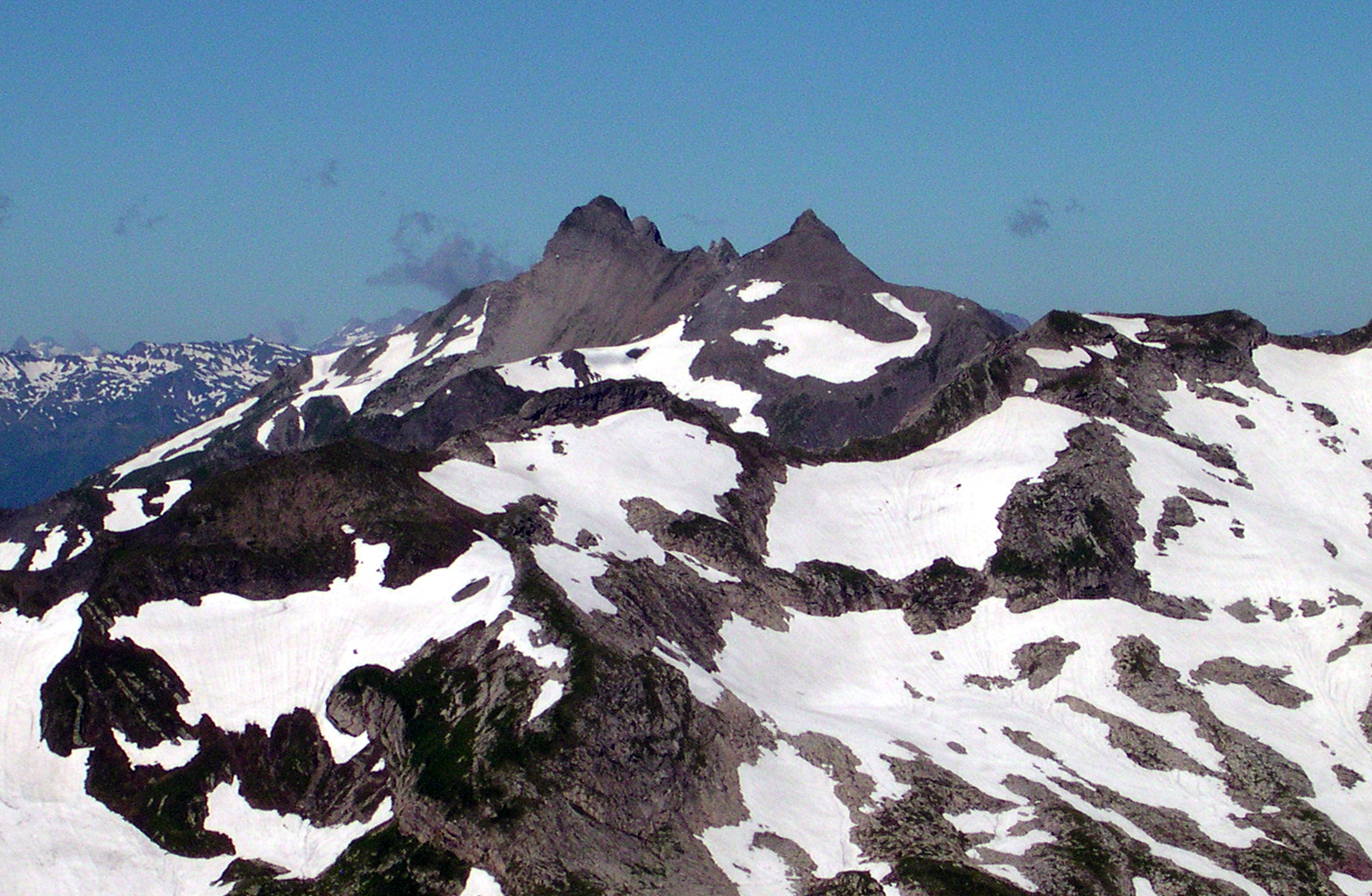
- View from the east side

Highest point
- Elevation: 2,599 m (8,527 ft)
- Prominence: 353 m (1,158 ft)
- Parent peak: Schesaplana
- Listing: Country high point
- Coordinates: 47°03′10″N 9°34′55″E

Naming
- English translation: grey peak
- Language of name: German
- Pronunciation: German: [ˈɡraʊʃpɪts]

Geography
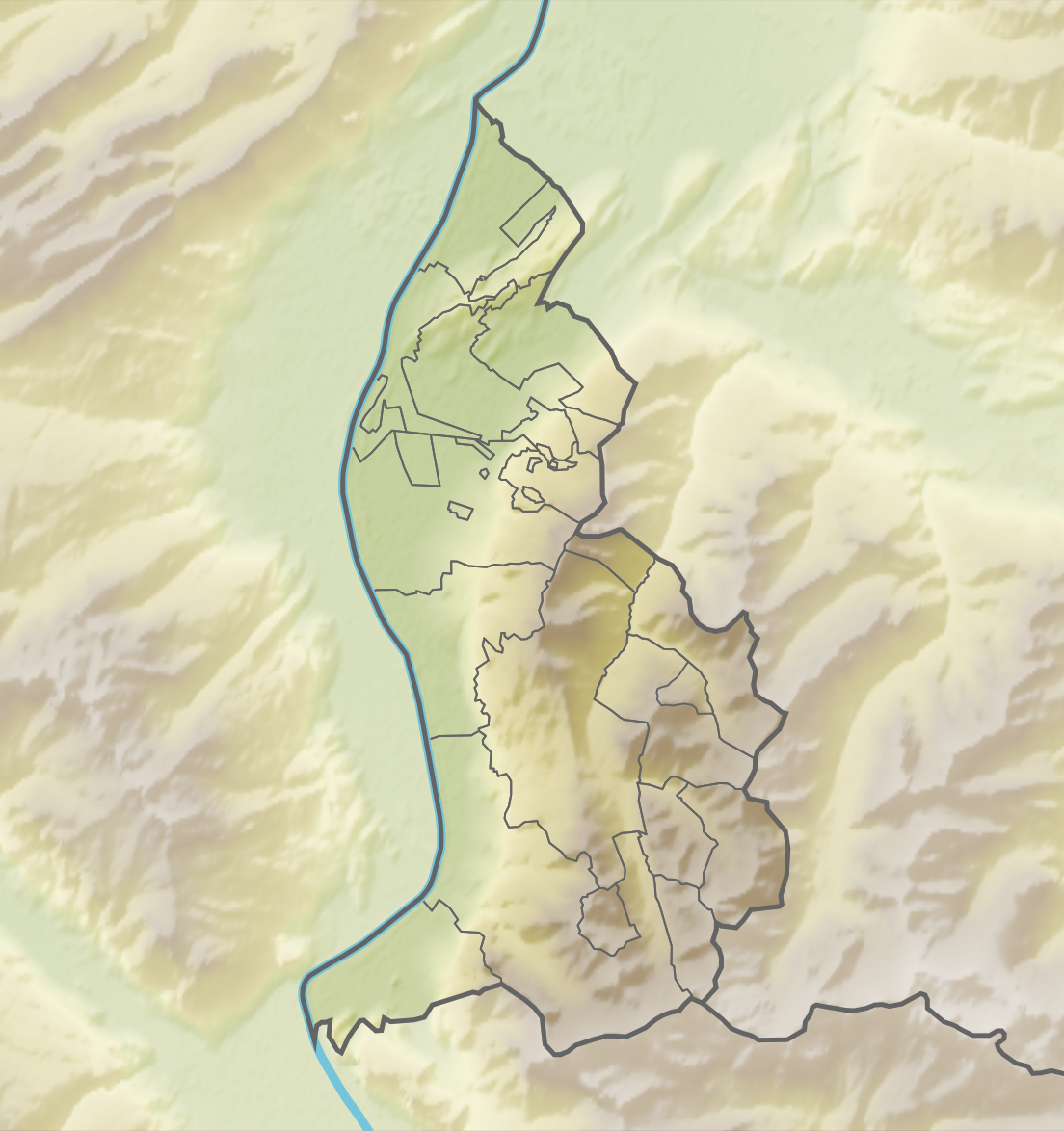
- Location within Liechtenstein
- Location: Triesen, Liechtenstein; Graubünden, Switzerland
- Parent range: Rätikon, Alps

The Grauspitz (Vorder Grauspitze or Vorder Grauspitz on some maps) is a mountain in the Rätikon range of the Alps, located on the border between Liechtenstein and Switzerland. With an elevation of 2,599 metres (8,527 ft) above sea level, the Grauspitz is the highest mountain in Liechtenstein. It is also the highest summit of the Rätikon range west of the Schesaplana massif.

The mountain lies between the valleys of Lawenatal (municipality of Triesen) on the north and the Fläscher Tal (canton of Graubünden, municipality of Fläsch) on the south. Both sides of the Grauspitz are in the basin of the Rhine, which flows approximately 7 kilometres (4.3 miles) west of the mountain.

The easiest route to the summit ascends over the peak Hinter Grauspitz, and along a class 3–4 razor ridge.

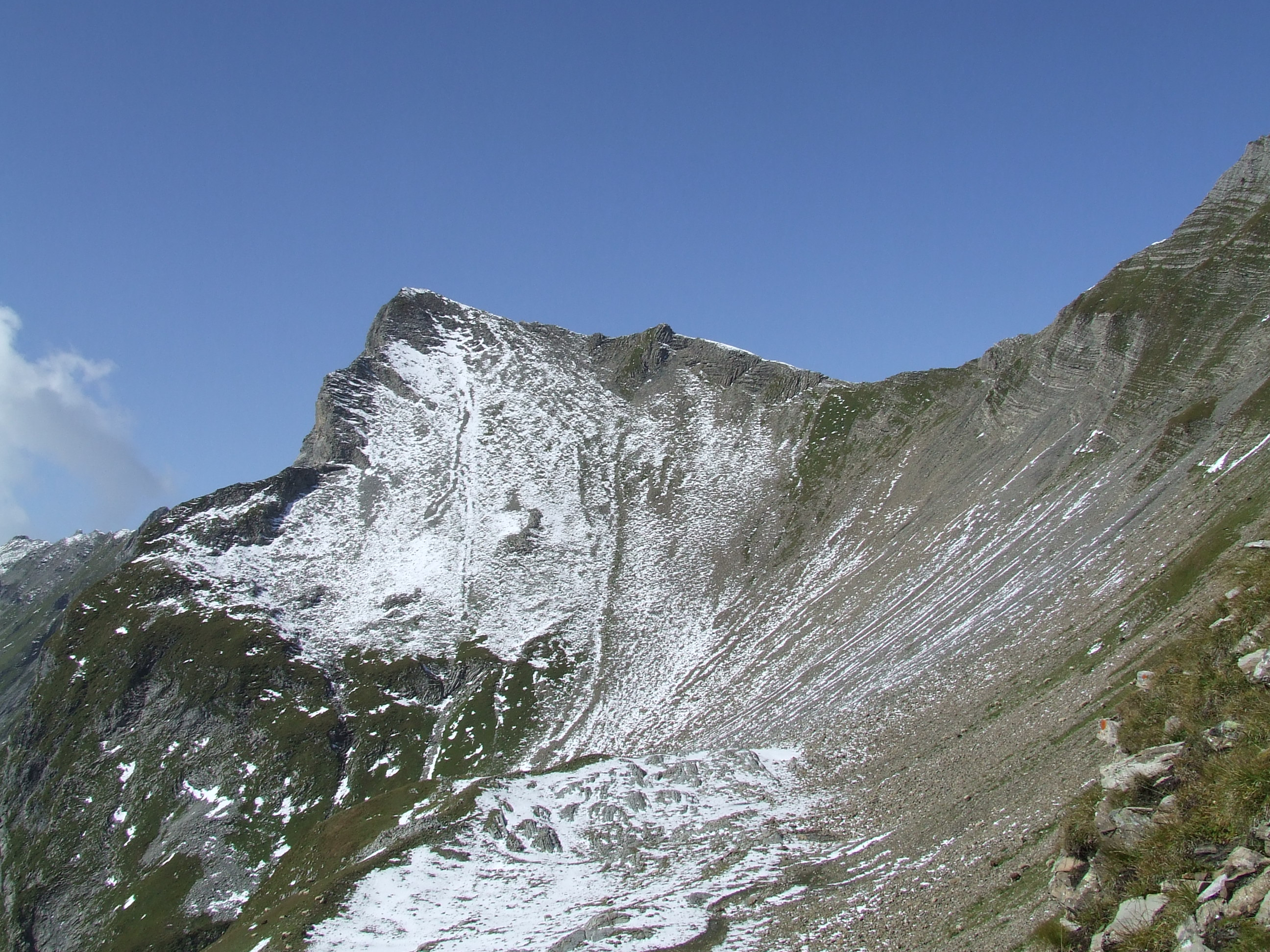
The Grauspitz from the (Swiss) east side
