= Schesaplana =

Mountain in Switzerland

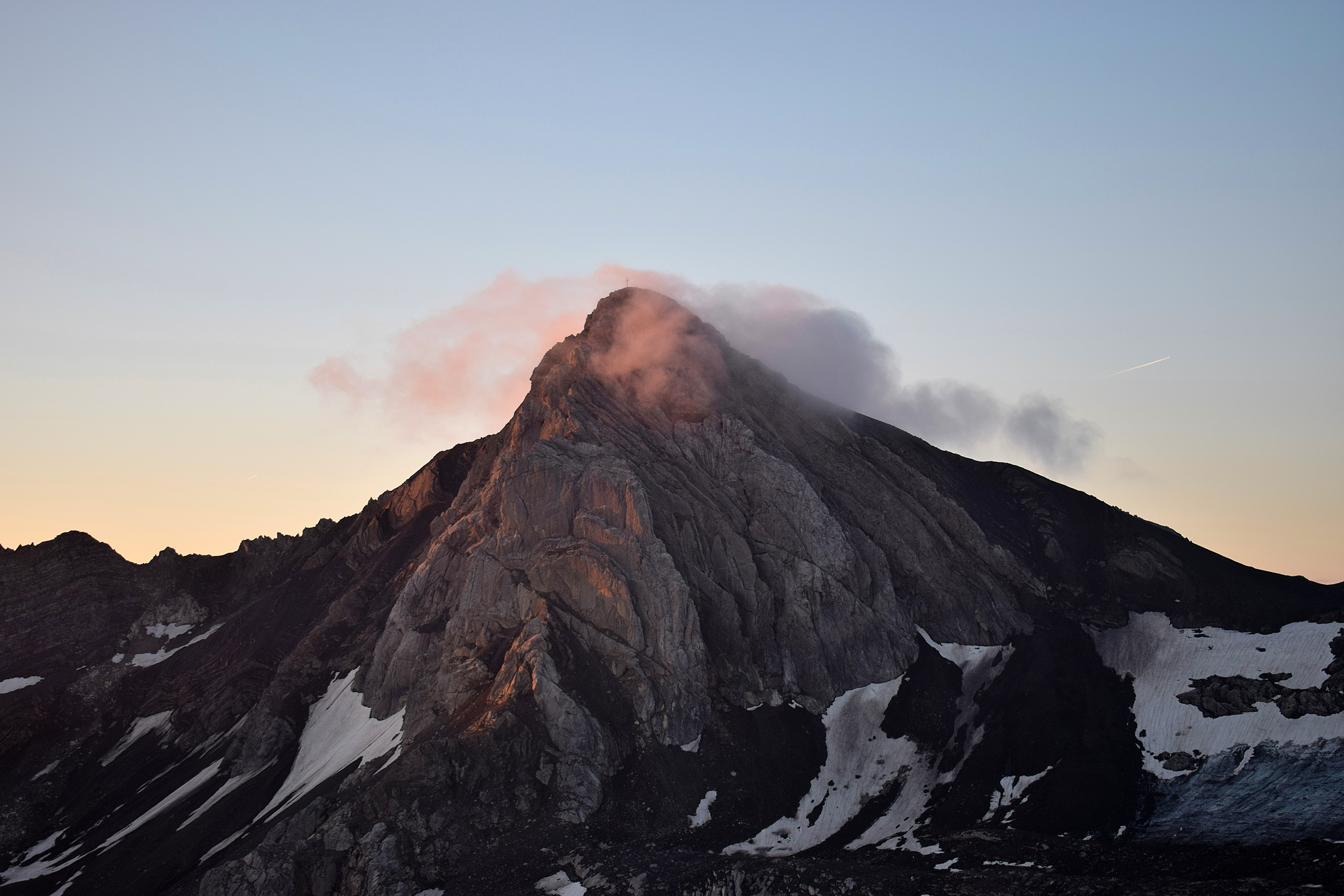
- The Schesaplana

Highest point
- Elevation: 2,964.3 m (9,725 ft)(Swiss measurement); 2,965 metres (Austrian measurement)
- Prominence: 829 m (2,720 ft)
- Parent peak: Gross Seehorn (line parent)
- Isolation: 30.31 km (18.83 mi) to Chlein Seehorn
- Coordinates: 47°03′14″N 9°42′26″E

Geography
- Location within Alps
- Location: Vorarlberg, Austria; Graubünden, Switzerland
- Parent range: Rätikon

Climbing
- First ascent: 24 August 1610 by Christa Barball, Claus Manall, David Pappus
- Easiest route: Hike

The Schesaplana (German pronunciation: [ʃezaˈplaːna]) is the highest mountain in the Rätikon mountain range at the border between Vorarlberg, Austria and Graubünden, Switzerland. It has an elevation of 2,964.3 m (9,725 ft).

On the north side of the Schesaplana is a glacier called Brandner Gletscher. To the east is the Lünersee.

It is possible to reach the summit on various routes during a hike, making it useful for a multiday trek between the mountain huts in the area. A more horizontal trek is following the whole of the Rätikon chain along its southern face, called "Prättigauer Höhenweg".

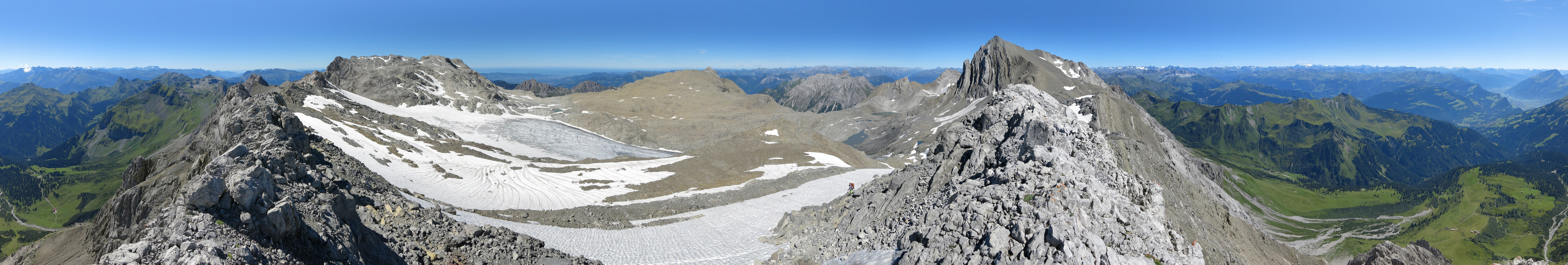
Panoramic view over the massif of the Schesaplana

== In literature ==
The Schesaplana is one of two mountains named in Johanna Spyri's 1881 novel Heidi. The title character describes them to her grandfather after having seen them both from the meadow where the goats are taken daily to graze, and he tells her their names. The other mountain is the Falknis, some 11 km away to the west.

== Paleontology ==
Between 1976 and 1990 a team of scientists mapping the Kössen Formation of Canton Grisons excavated a series of fossil remains on the Schesaplana's southern slope. In April 2022 researchers announced that the fragments represent three ichthyosaurs. The discovery also included the largest ichthyosaur tooth ever found.

== See also ==
- List of most isolated mountains of Switzerland
