= Rätikon =

Mountain range on the border between Austria, Switzerland and Liechtenstein

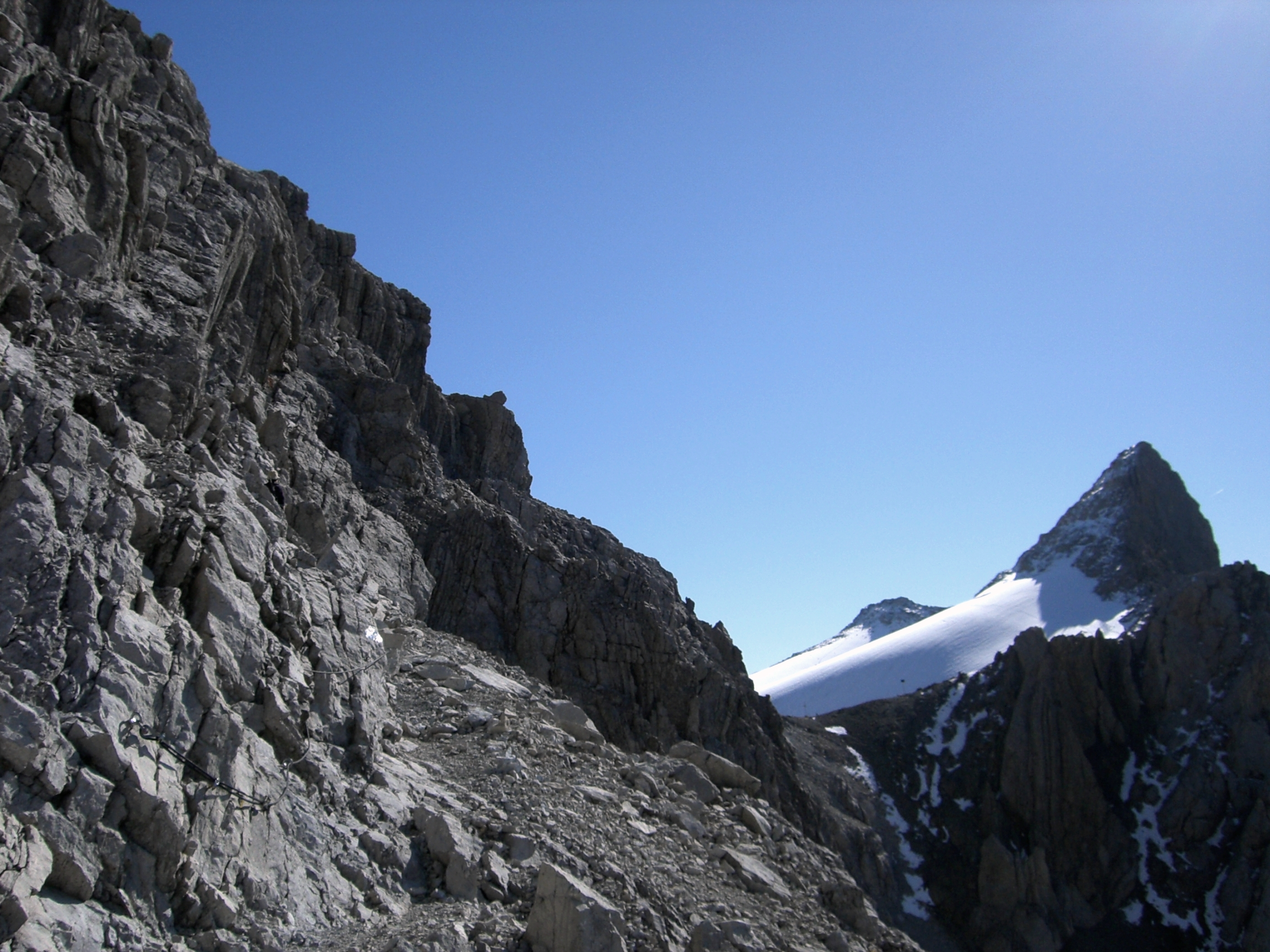
- Schesaplana

Highest point
- Peak: Schesaplana
- Elevation: 2,964 m (9,724 ft)
- Coordinates: 47°3′14″N 9°42′46″E

Geography
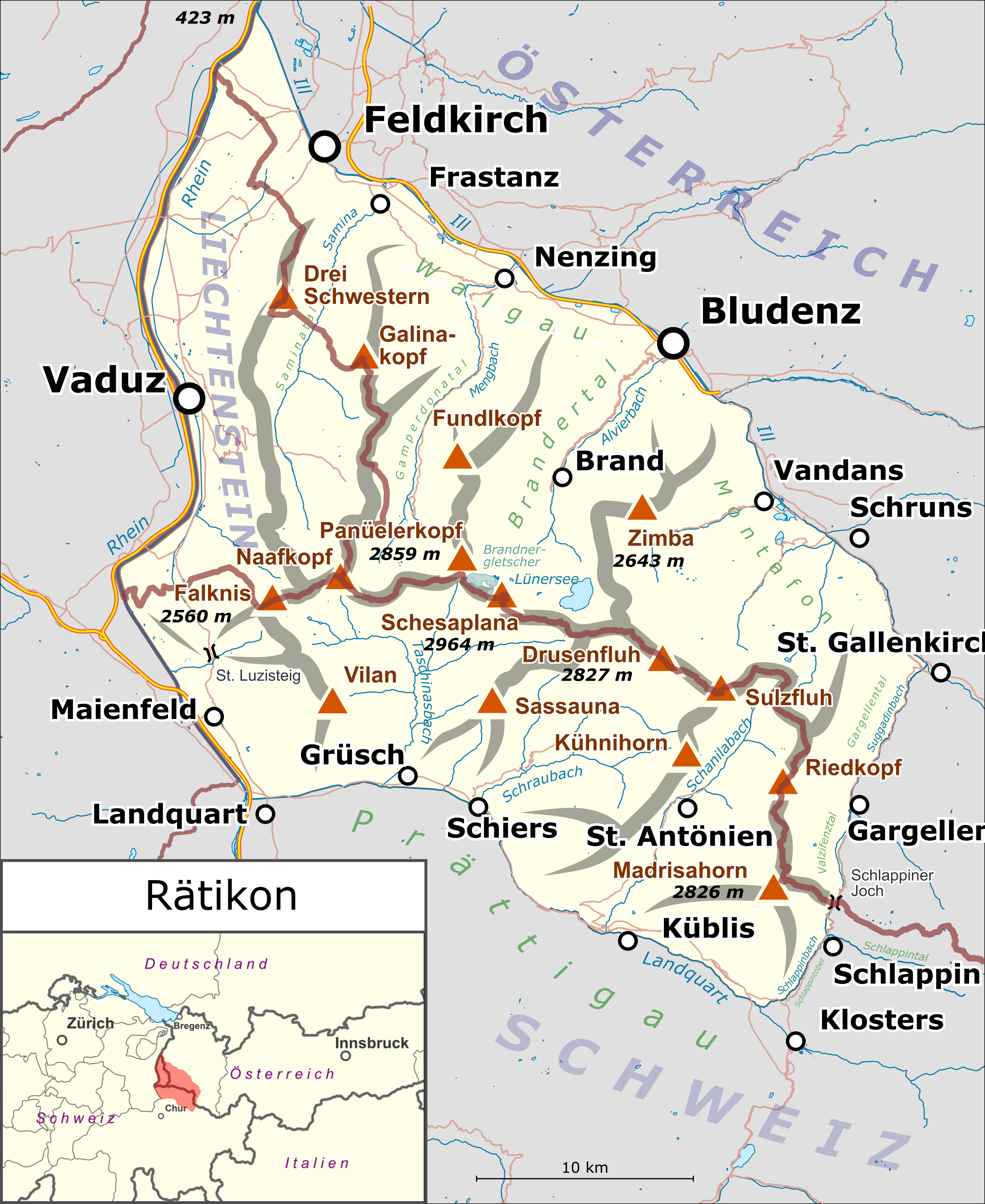
- Rätikon; The borders of the range according to Alpine Club classification of the Eastern Alps
- Countries: Austria; Switzerland; Liechtenstein
- States: Vorarlberg; Graubünden, Canton of Grisons
- Range coordinates: 47°3′N 9°45′E
- Parent range: Central Eastern Alps
- Borders on: Silvretta; Verwall Alps; Plessur Range; Appenzell Alps
- Topo map: Swiss Federal Office of Topography swisstopo

The Rätikon is a mountain range of the Central Eastern Alps, located at the border between Vorarlberg, Liechtenstein and Graubünden. It is the geological border between the Eastern and Western Alps and stretches from the Montafon as far as the Rhine. In the south, the Prättigau is its limit, and in the north, it is the Walgau. In the east, it borders the Silvretta groups. The Rätikon mountain range derives its name from Raetia, a province of the Roman Empire, named after the Rhaetian (Raeti or Rhaeti) people.

== Topography and geology ==
The classification of the Rätikon to the central Eastern Alps is based solely on geographic-geological traditions. Large parts of the Rätikon consist of sedimentary rocks (limestone). From a geological point of view, the north-west Rätikon is assigned to the Northern Limestone Alps, while the South-West Rätikon belongs to the Bündner schist/Bündner slate of the Western Alps.

== Peaks ==
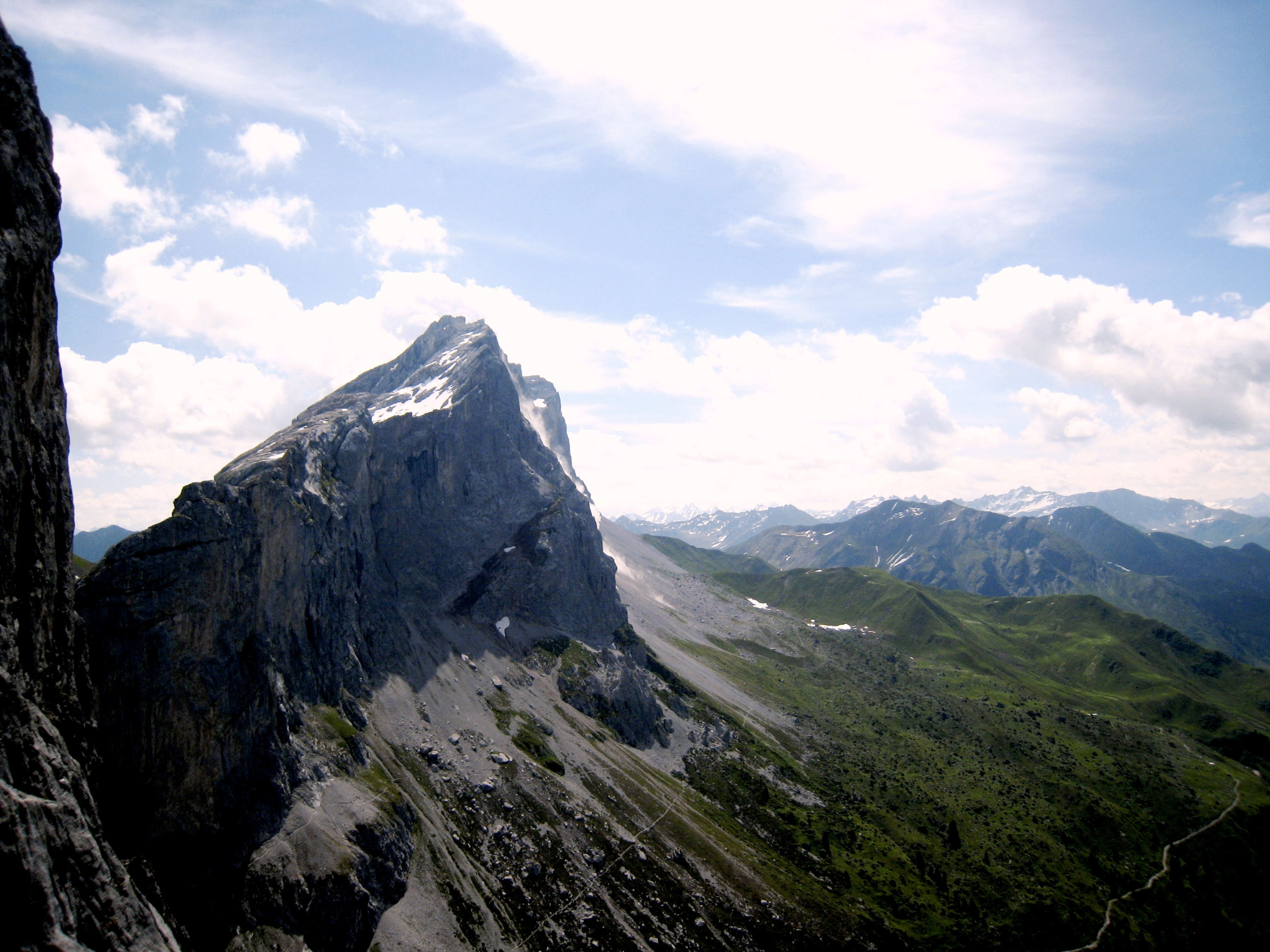
Drusenfluh

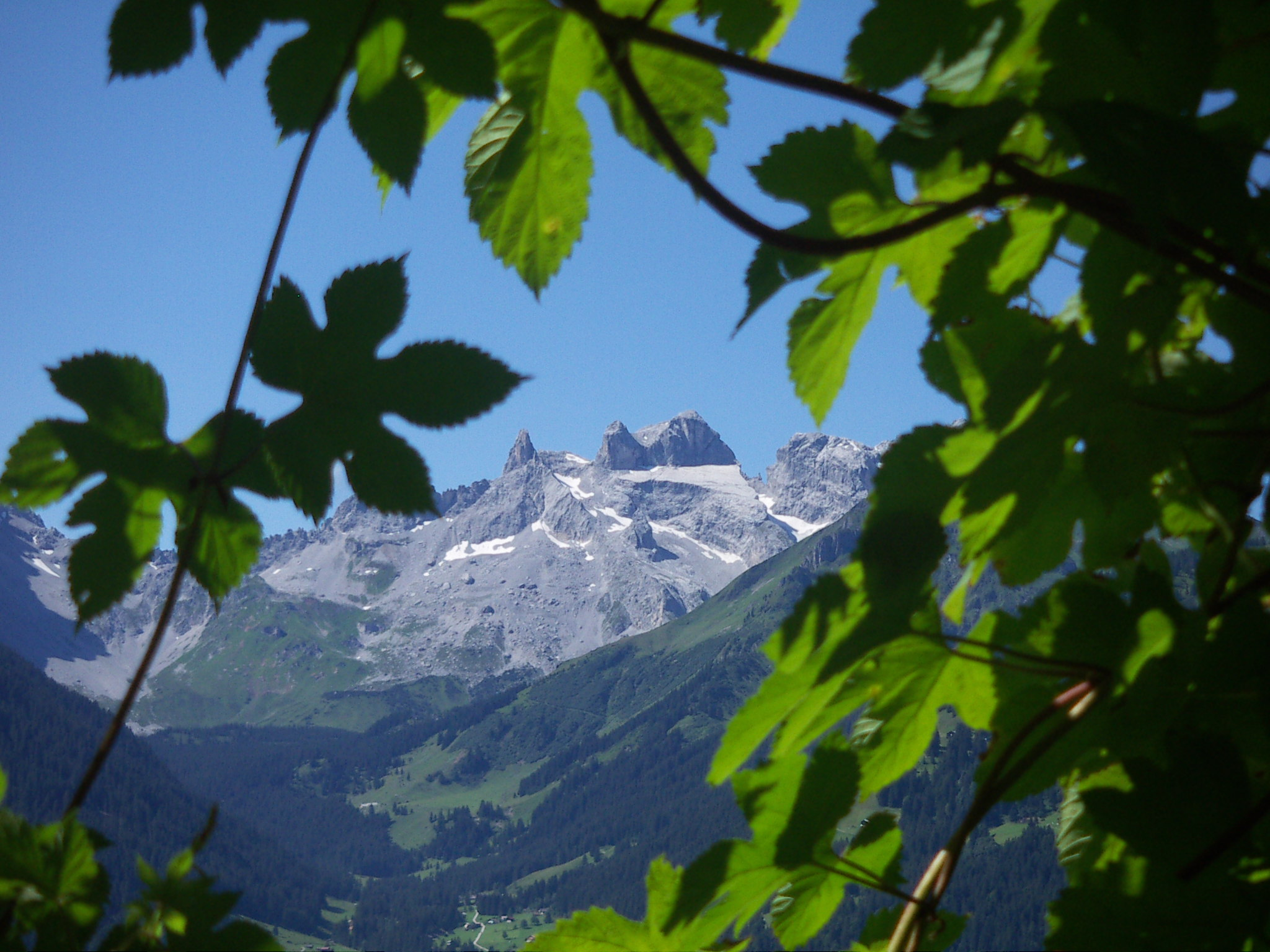
Drei Türme

Its chief peaks are:

- Schesaplana 2964 m (9725 ft)
- Schiltfluh 2890 m (9482 ft)
- Panüelerkopf 2859 m (9380 ft)
- Drusenfluh 2829 m (9282 ft)
- Madrisahorn 2830 m (9285 ft)
- Sulzfluh 2820 m (9252 ft)
- Wildberg 2788 m (9147 ft)
- Rätschenhorn 2703 m (8868 ft)
- Zimbaspitze 2643 m (8678 ft)
- Schijenflue 2627 m (8619 ft)
- Vorder Grauspitz 2599 m (8528 ft)
- Falknis 2566 m (8419 ft)
- Naafkopf 2571 m (8445 ft)
- Hornspitze 2537 m (8323 ft)
- Glegghorn 2447 m (8028 ft)
- Vilan 2376 m (7795 ft)
- Sassauna 2308 m (7572 ft)

For a list of passes see Passes of the Silvretta and Rätikon Ranges.

A multiday hike that follows a big portion of the Rätikon chain on its southern side is called "Prättigauer Höhenweg".

== Neighboring mountain groups ==
The Rätikon is adjacent to the following other mountain groups in the Alps:

- In the north-east to the Bregenz Forest Mountains and to the Lechquellen Mountains, these two groups belong to the Northern Limestone Alps in the Eastern Alps.
- In the east to the Verwall Alps (Central Alps)
- In the southeast to the Silvretta Alps (Central Alps)
- In the south-west to the Plessur Alps (Central Alps)
- In the west to the Glarus Alps (Western Alps)
- In the north-west of the Appenzell Alps (Western Alps)
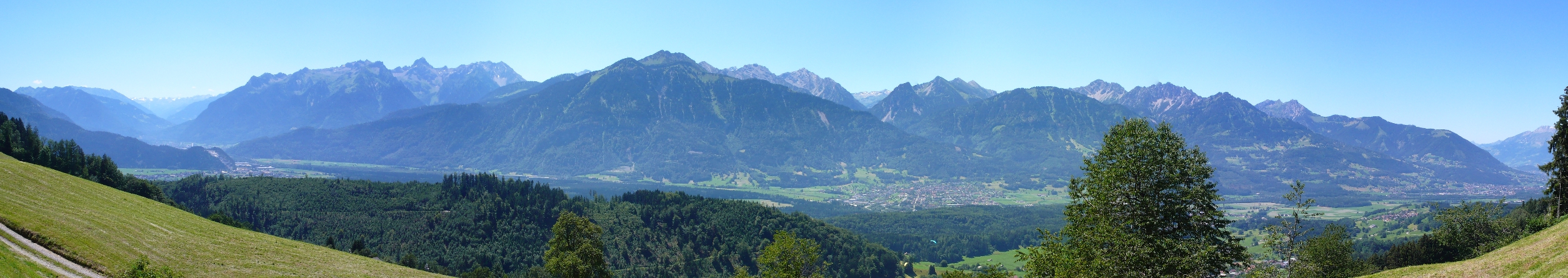
View of the southern terrace of the Walserkamm (Bregenz Forest Mountains) across the Walgau towards the south to the entire Austrian northern flank of the Rätikon; To the left are the Lechquellen Mountains, the west of the Verwall group, and a view of the Montafon and the central Silvretta; To the right, the view over the Rhine valley to the Appenzell Alps.

== Tourism ==
Because of the many mountains, the Rätikon is a first class area for all alpine sports such as hiking, skiing (including freeriding), cross-country skiing, mountain biking, etc. The position of the mountain chain allows for beautiful and panoramic views. The cableways permit shortened ascents and descents and enable pure high-altitude hiking.

Thanks to many Alpine shelters ("huts"), daylong or multi-day walks are possible. Many huts are hosted and offer sleeping accommodations. The season usually starts in early April to late September / October, depending on the weather. Before starting a tour, it is advisable to inquire about vacancies and locations at regional tourist offices or in the different villages.

=== Mountain Huts ===
Mountain huts operated by the following organizations are found in the Vorarlberg part of the Rätikon: German, Austrian Alpine Club and friends of nature Austria:

- Douglasshütte near Brand
- Feldkircherhütte near Feldkirch
- Haus Matschwitz on Matschwitz near Latschau
- Heinrich-Hueter-Hütte near Vandans
- Lindauer Hütte near Tschagguns
- Madrisahütte near Gargellen
- Mannheimer Hütte near Brand
- Oberzalimhütte near Brand
- Sarotlahütte near Brand
- Schwabenhaus on the Tschengla near Bürserberg
- Tilisunahütte near Tschagguns
- Totalphütte near Brand
- Alpine Restaurant "Gamperdona" near Nenzinger Himmel

In Liechtenstein's part of the Rätikon, the following huts of the Liechtensteiner Alpenverein may be found:

- Gafadurahütte near Nendeln
- Pfälzerhütte near Steg

In the Graubünden or Grisons Rätikon, huts of the Swiss Alpine Club and other mountain houses may be found:

- Enderlinhütte near Maienfeld
- Schesaplanahütte near Seewis im Prättigau
- Carschinahütte near St. Antönien
- Mountain huts Sulzfluh and Alpenrösli near St. Antönien

=== Mountain railways ===
In Montafon/Vorarlberg:

- Lünerseebahn near Brand
- Golmerbahn in Vadans/Tschagguns
- Bergbahnen Gargellen

In Grison/Graubünden:

- Älplibahn Malans
- Seilbahn Fanas
- Madrisa Klosters Bergbahnen

== See also ==
- Limestone Alps
- Swiss Alps
