= Drei Schwestern =

Mountain on the border of Austria and Liechtenstein

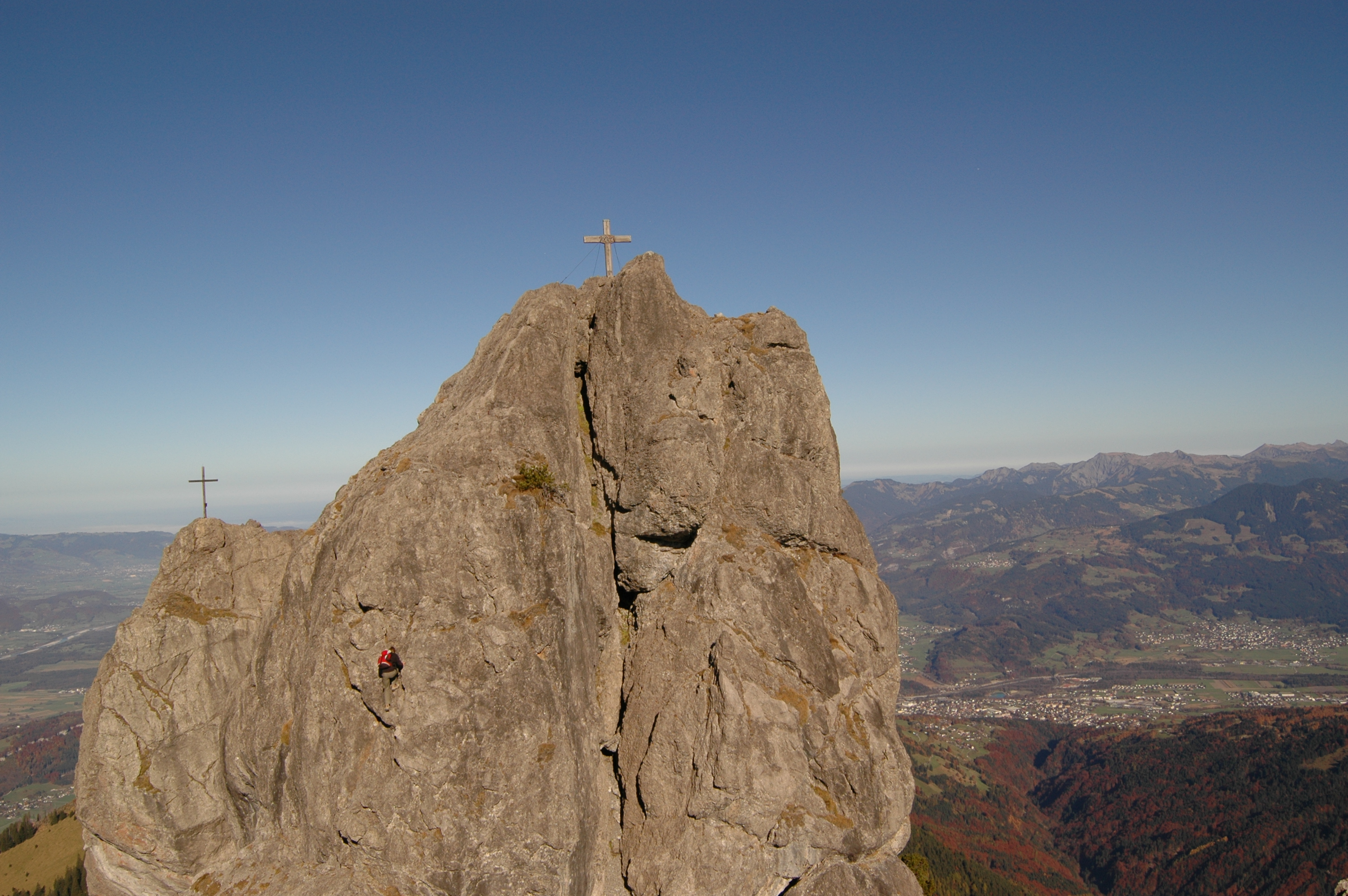

Highest point
- Elevation: 2,053 m (6,736 ft)
- Coordinates: 47°10′30″N 9°34′17″E

Naming
- English translation: Three Sisters
- Language of name: German

Geography
- Location: Border between Austria and Liechtenstein
- Parent range: Rätikon

Climbing
- First ascent: 1870, John Sholto Douglass and a hunter named Wieser

Drei Schwestern (The Three Sisters) is a mountain located on the border of Austria and Liechtenstein. It forms a natural boundary between Liechtenstein and the Austrian state of Vorarlberg.

The Three Sisters are a three-peaked mountain chain in the Rätikon, a mountain range of the Western Central Alps. The highest peak, the Great Sister, is 2,053 metres (6,736 ft) above sea level. The Middle Sister, located north-east of it reaches a height of 2,048 metres (6,719 ft), and the north-eastern Little Sister 2,034 metres (6,673 ft) high.

The three peaks mark the border between Feldkirch in Austria and Liechtenstein. Through a well-developed road system, they are easily accessible and are often climbed.

The first ascent was probably made by hunters. The first recorded ascent was on 10 June 1870 by John Sholto Douglass from Thüringen, Vorarlberg, with a hunter named Wieser from Frastanz.

== Location and surroundings ==
The chain of the Three Sisters is located in the extreme northwest of the Rätikon. The three peaks form a ridge that runs from north to south. To the west, the Three Sisters fall into the Alpine Rhine Valley, in the east to the Saminatal. The ridge to the south leads to the border summit Garsellakopf, and further south to Kuhgrat, which is entirely in Liechtenstein.

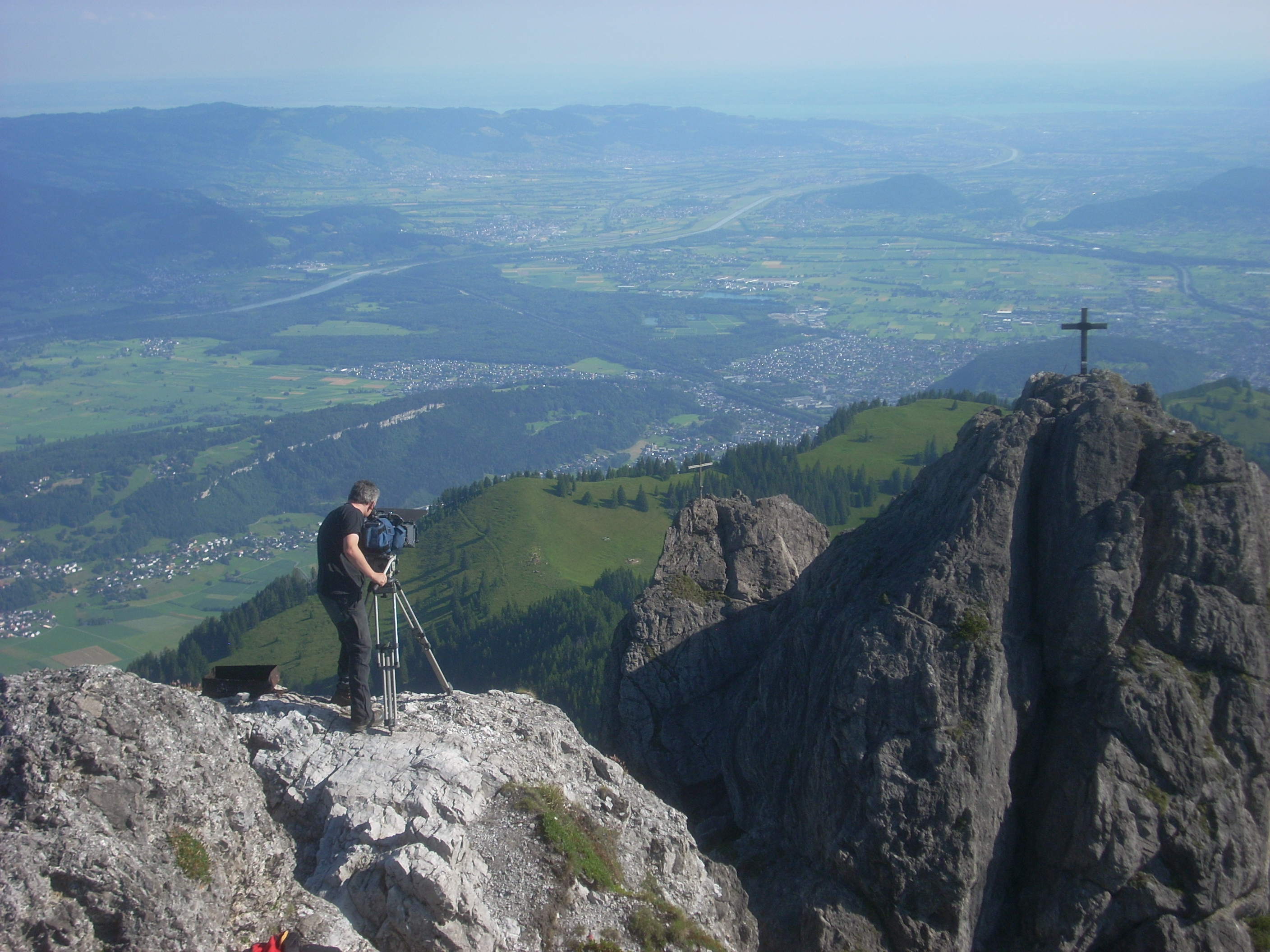
Filming at the Drei Schwestern

The area is well developed for hikers through an extensive network of paths. The main peak can also be reached by rock climbing routes ranging from UIAA difficulty levels II to V. The north wall of the middle sister has routes with a UIAA level VI difficulty.

== Conservation ==
The Vorarlberg region of the Three Sisters was granted a protected landscape status in 1976.

== Sources and maps ==
- Hermann Braendle: Rätikon Reader, weiter Himmel, wilder Fels; Bergwandern im Rätikon. Bucher, Hohenems / Wien 2009, ISBN 978-3-902679-15-4.
- Manfred Hunziker: Ringelspitz / Arosa / Rätikon, Vom Pass dil Segnas zum Schlappiner Joch, Verlag des SAC, Bern 2010, ISBN 978-3-85902-313-0 (= Alpine Touren / Bündner Alpen).
- Günther Flaig: Alpenvereinsführer Rätikon, Bergverlag Rother, München 1989, ISBN 3-7633-1098-3
- Landeskarte der Schweiz 1:25.000, Blatt 1136: Drei Schwestern.
