= Kuhgrat =

Mountain on the Austria-Liechtenstein border

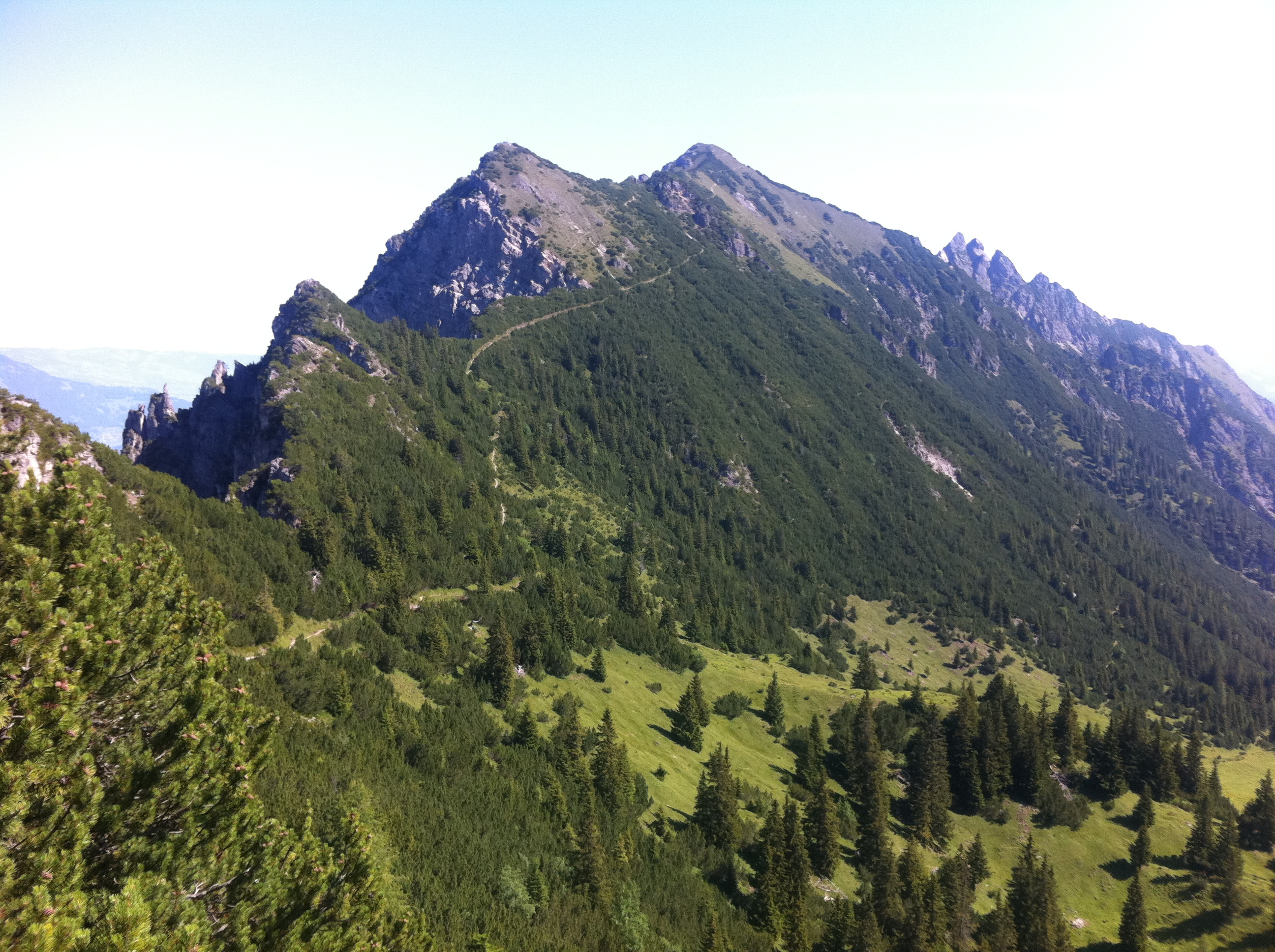

Highest point
- Elevation: 2,123 m (6,965 ft)
- Coordinates: AT_scale:100000 47°10′00″N 9°33′39″E

Geography
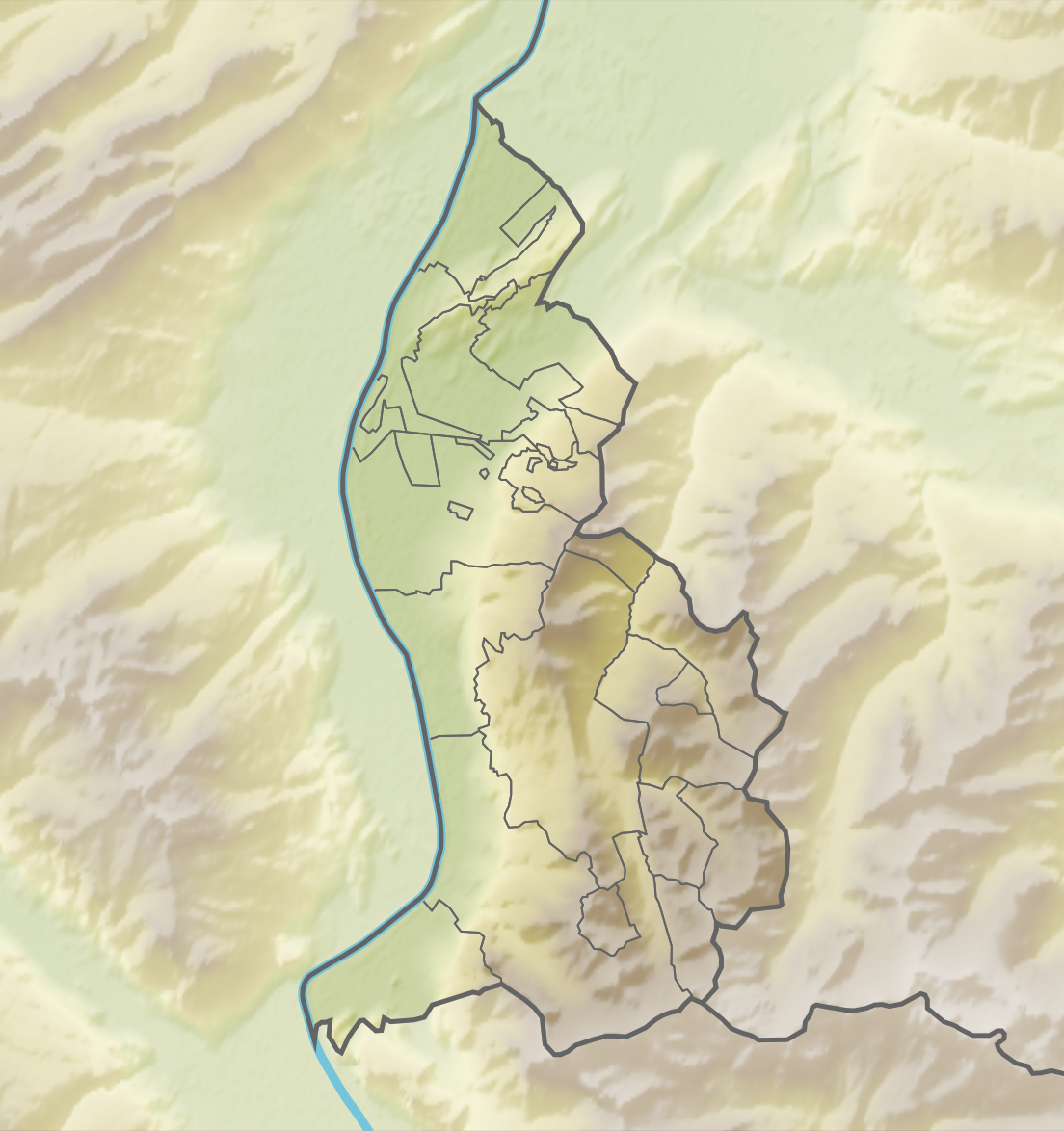
- Location within Liechtenstein
- Location: Liechtenstein / Austria
- Parent range: Rätikon, Alps

Kuhgrat (or Kuegrat) is the highest of a group of three peaks known as the Drei Schwestern in the Rätikon range in the Eastern Alps which between them form part of the Austria-Liechtenstein border. It reaches a height of 2,123 metres (6,965 ft).
