= Garsellakopf =

Mountain on the border of Liechtenstein and Austria

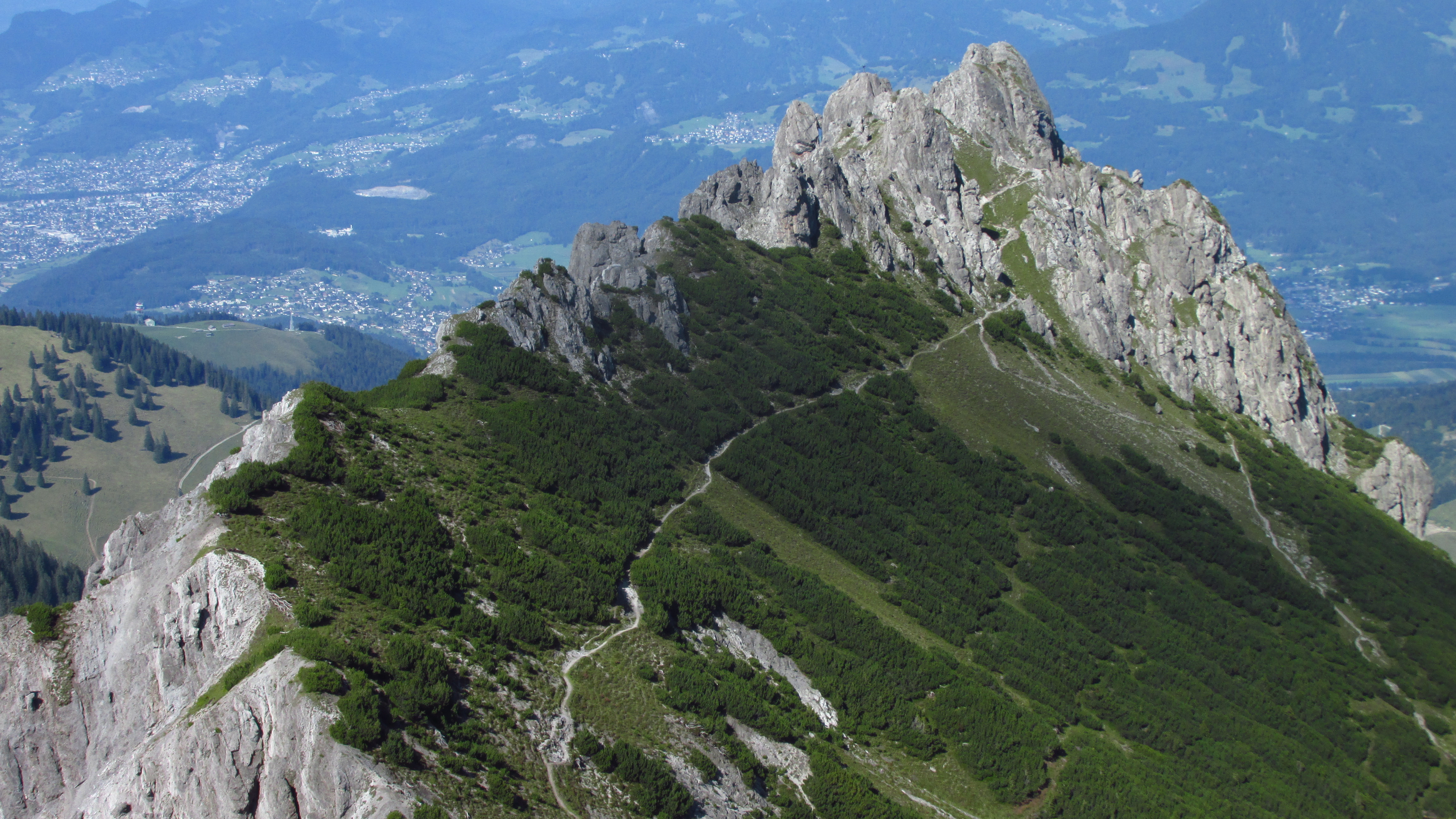

Highest point
- Elevation: 2,105 m (6,906 ft)
- Coordinates: 47°10′13″N 9°33′53″E

Geography
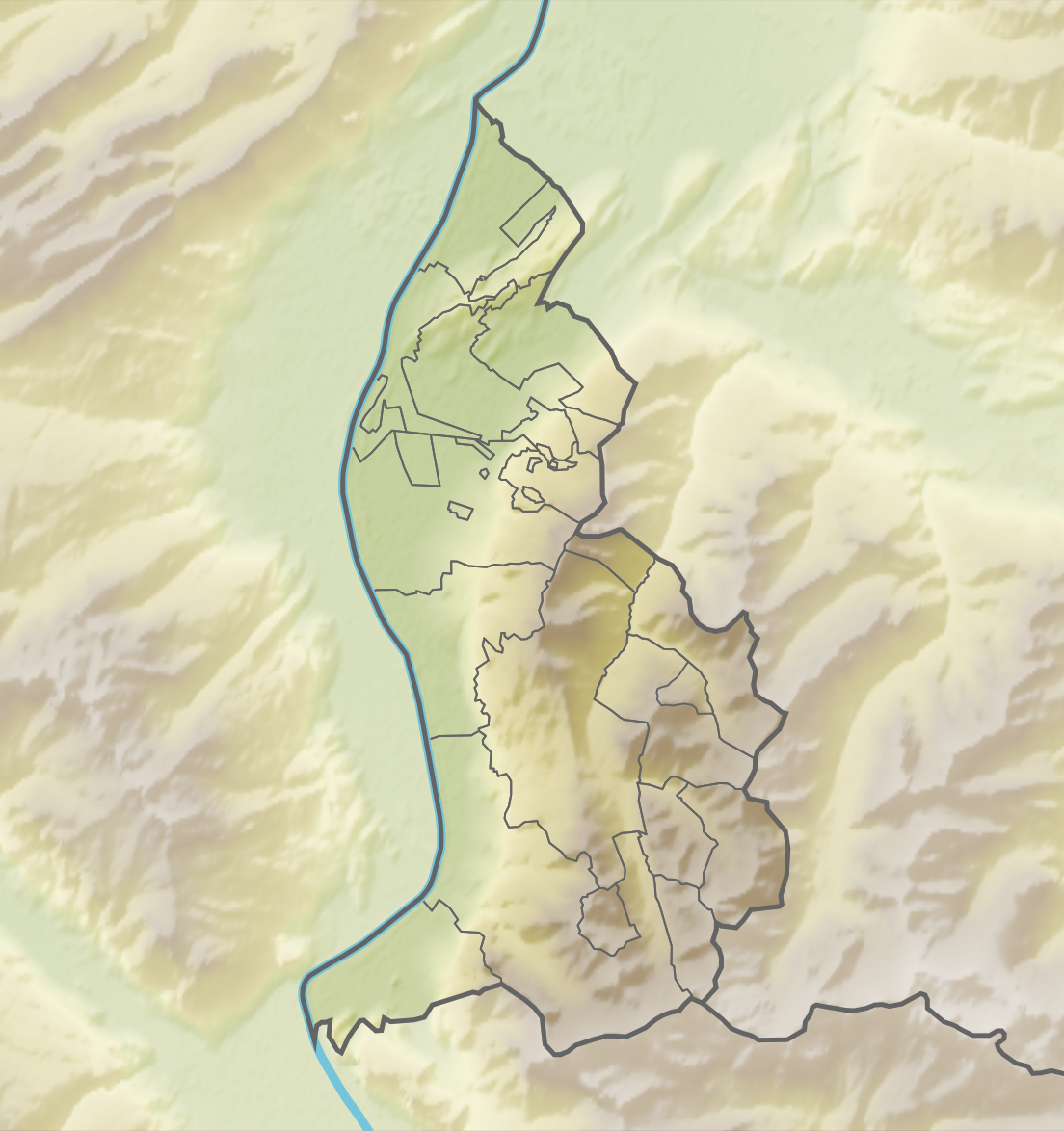
- Location within Liechtenstein
- Location: Liechtenstein / Austria
- Parent range: Rätikon, Alps

Garsellakopf is a mountain on the border of Liechtenstein and Austria in the Rätikon range of the Eastern Alps to the east of the town of Schaan, with a height of 2,105 metres (6,906 ft).
