= Edelweiss (disambiguation) =

Edelweiss (German: Edelweiß) is a European mountain flower.

Edelweiss may also refer to:

== People ==
- Edelweiss (actress) (born 1977), Russian-Bulgarian pornographic actress
- Edelweiss (given name)

== Plants ==
- Edelweiss (grape), a table and white wine grape
- Chasselas or Edelweiss, a wine grape
- Javanese edelweiss or Anaphalis javanica, a plant species found on the mountains of Indonesia
- Leontopodium
- Rauschling Edelweiss or Completer, a wine grape

== Arts, entertainment, and media ==
=== Gaming ===
- Edelweiss, an expansion module for the Panzer Grenadier series board games
- Edelweiss, a tank prototype in the videogame Valkyria Chronicles

=== Literature ===
- Edelweiss (visual novel), a 2007 Japanese visual novel published by MangaGamer
- Edelweiss, an online book publishers' catalogue by Above the Treeline
- Edelweiss, capital of the fictional European nation of Graustark

=== Music ===
- Edelweiss (band), an Austrian band in the late 1980s and early 1990s
- Edelweiß (album), a 1982 album by Joachim Witt
- Edelweiss (Drezden album), 2019
- "Edelweiss" (song), a 1959 show tune from the Rodgers and Hammerstein's The Sound of Music
- Edelweiss, a piano solo, Op. 31 by Gustav Lange

=== Other media ===
- Edelweiss (magazine), a magazine published by Ringier in Switzerland
- "Edelweiss" (Space Ghost Coast to Coast), a television episode
- Edelweiss (film), a 1987 Taiwanese film starring Michael Miu
- Edelweiss (play), a 2009 Hong Kong play about the 1989 Tiananmen Square protests and massacre

== Brands and enterprises ==
- Edelweiss, a beer produced by the Schoenhofen Brewing Company
- Edelweiss Air, a Swiss charter airline
- Edelweiss Lodge and Resort, an AFRC hotel complex in Germany run by the United States military
  - Edelweiss Vacation Village and Campground
- Edelweiss Pianos or Edelweiss, a British piano company
- Edelweiss Valley or Edelweiss, a ski resort in Quebec

== Nazi-related ==
- Edelweiss (anti-partisan unit), a German anti-partisan unit organized on the Slovak territory during World War II
- Edelweiss Pirates, an anti-Nazi youth culture in Germany before, during, and after World War II
- Kampfgeschwader 51 "Edelweiss", a World War II German Luftwaffe bomber group
- Operation Edelweiss, a German plan to capture the Caucasus and the oil fields of Baku in World War II

== Transport vehicles ==
- Edelweiss (train), an international express train in Europe
- Duruble Edelweiss or Edelweiss, a French light utility monoplane designed by Roland Duruble
- Siren Edelweiss, a French glider produced by SIREN as the C30S Edelweiss
- VR Class Sr2, a Finnish electric locomotive used by VR Group nicknamed "Edelweiss" because of it being based on the Swiss Re 460

== Other uses ==
- Edelweiss (skyscraper), a building in Moscow
- Edelweiss (political party), a regional political party of Aosta Valley (Italy)
- EDELWEISS, a European experiment searching for dark matter
- 10th Mountain Assault Brigade (Ukraine), a unit of the Ukrainian Ground Forces known as Edelweiss
- Special Purpose Unit of the National Guard "Vanguard" (previously "Edelweiss"), a special unit of the National Guard of Russia

== See also ==
- Eidelweiss, New Hampshire, village district
