= Dokumentationszentrum =

Dokumentationszentrum can refer to:

- Dokumentationszentrum Reichsparteitagsgelände Documentation Center Nazi Party Rally Grounds
- Dokumentationszentrum Obersalzberg
- Dokumentationszentrum Prora
- Dokumentationszentrum Alltagskultur der DDR
