= Walton Walker =

United States Army general (1889–1950)

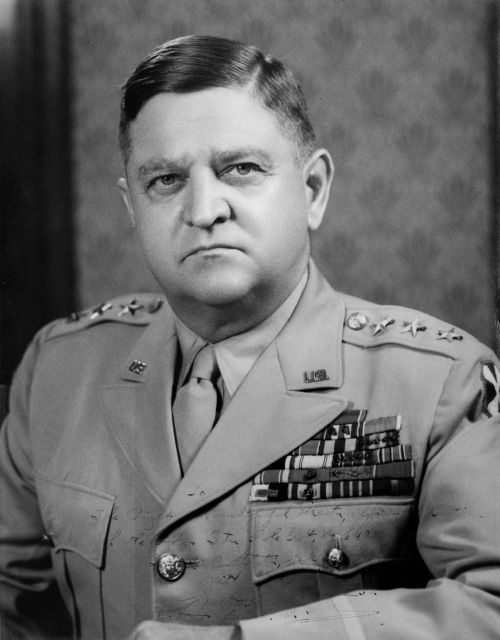
- Walker in 1950
- Born: 3 December 1889; Belton, Texas, United States
- Died: 23 December 1950 (aged 61); Dobong, Seoul, South Korea
- Burial place: Arlington National Cemetery, Virginia, United States
- Relatives: General Sam S. Walker (son)
- Military career
- Allegiance: United States
- Branch: United States Army
- Service years: 1912–1950
- Rank: General (posthumous)
- Nickname: "Johnnie Walker"
- Service number: 0-3405
- Unit: Infantry Branch
- Commands: Eighth United States Army; Fifth United States Army; Eighth Service Command; XX Corps; 3rd Armored Division
- Conflicts: Banana Wars; Occupation of Veracruz; World War I; World War II; Operation Overlord; Battle of Normandy; Normandy landings; Siegfried Line campaign; Battle of Metz; Battle of the Bulge; Central Europe campaign; Occupation of Japan; Korean War; Battle of Pusan Perimeter
- Awards: Distinguished Service Cross (2); Army Distinguished Service Medal (2); Silver Star (3); Legion of Merit; Distinguished Flying Cross (2); Bronze Star Medal; Air Medal (12); Army Commendation Medal; Eulji Order of Military Merit (2)

Walton Harris Walker (3 December 1889 – 23 December 1950) was a United States Army lieutenant general who was posthumously promoted to general who served with distinction in World War I, World War II, and the Korean War, where he commanded the Eighth United States Army before dying in a jeep accident. He received two Distinguished Service Crosses for extraordinary heroism in World War II and the Korean War.

== Early life ==
Walker was born in Belton, Texas, on 3 December 1889. His parents, Sam and Lydia Walker were both college graduates whose fathers had been officers in the Confederate Army. His father, a merchant, taught him how to ride a horse and to hunt and shoot. He graduated from the Wedemeyer Academy, a school which operated in Belton from 1886 to 1911. From a young age, to the United States Military Academy (USMA) at West Point, New York, and he hoped to be a general one day.

== Early military career ==
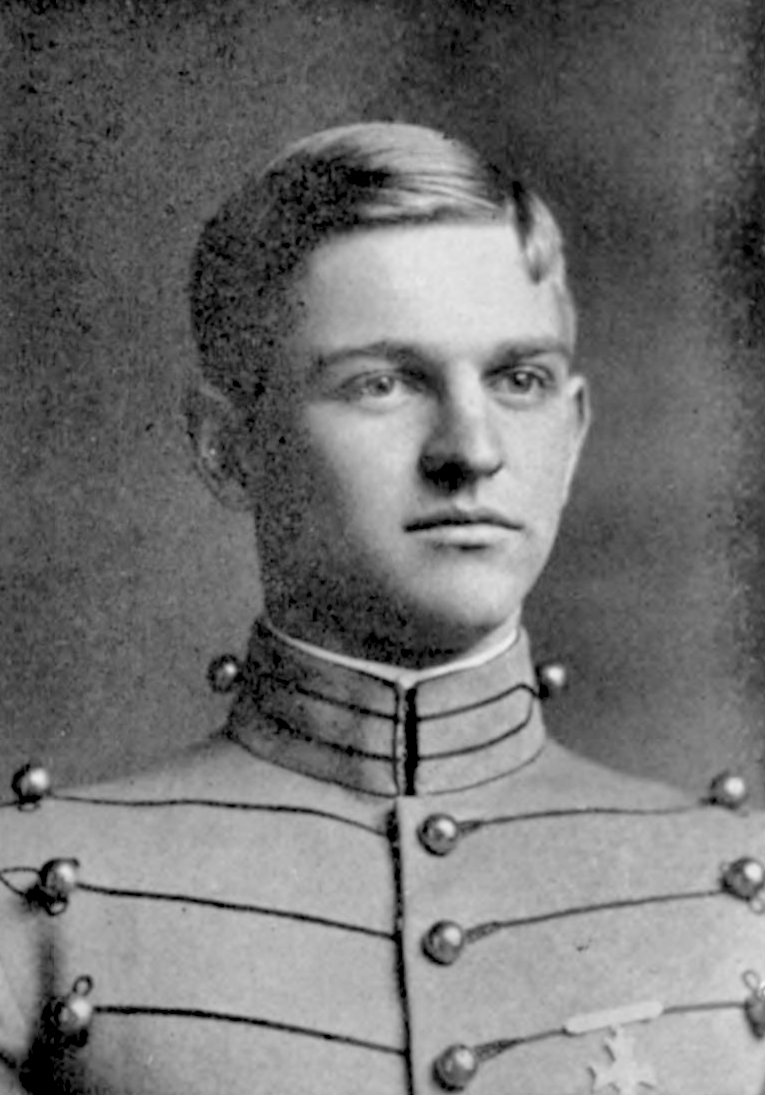
At West Point in 1912

Walker attended the Virginia Military Institute in preparation for his education at the USMA. He entered the Academy on 15 June 1907, but resigned on 7 October 1907. He reentered the Academy on March 3, 1908, and was commissioned a second lieutenant of Infantry on 12 June 1912.

As a lieutenant, Walker served at Fort Sheridan, Illinois; Fort Crockett, Texas; Veracruz, Mexico; Galveston, Texas; and Fort Sam Houston, Texas, from June 1912 to May 1917. He was a member of the 1914 Veracruz expedition under Brigadier General Frederick Funston; patrolling on the U.S.-Mexican border in 1916, he developed a close friendship with Dwight D. Eisenhower. He was promoted to captain on 15 May 1917, a few weeks after the American entry into World War I. He served at Camp Funston, Kansas, from May to December 1917, and Fort Sam Houston with the 13th Machine Gun Battalion from December 1917 to April 1918.

During World War I, Walker deployed to France with the 13th Machine Gun Company, 5th Machine Gun Battalion, 5th Division in April 1918, and, after being promoted to major on 17 June 1918, served as a company commander and then battalion commander to July 1919, by which time the war was over. He was awarded two Silver Stars for gallantry in action.

== Interwar period ==
After the war, Walker rotated through a variety of assignments at Camp Benning, Georgia, and Fort Sill, Oklahoma, and served as a company commander and instructor at West Point from August 1923 to June 1925. He attended the Command and General Staff School at Fort Leavenworth, Kansas, from September 1925 to June 1926. He then served at Fort Monroe, Virginia, from June 1926 to July 1930. He next commanded the 2nd Battalion, 15th Infantry at Camp Burrowes, Qinhuangdao and American Barracks, Tianjin, China, from September 1930 to March 1933.

He was promoted to lieutenant colonel on 1 August 1935, and, after attending the United States Army War College from August 1935 until June 1936, he served as post executive officer and then brigade executive officer with the 5th Infantry Brigade, 3rd Division, from August 1936 to June 1937; the brigade was commanded by George C. Marshall, the future Army Chief of Staff.

== World War II ==
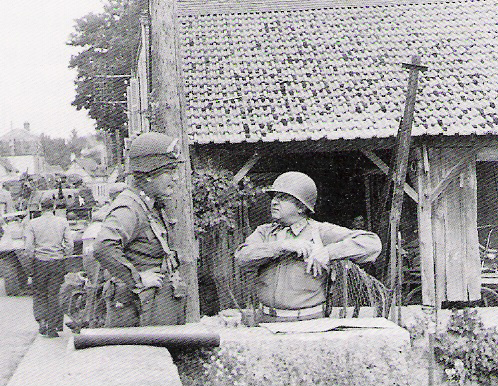
Major General Walton H. Walker (right) engaged in conversation with Major General Lindsay McDonald Silvester, commander of the 7th Armored Division, in late August 1944

Walker served as a staff officer in the War Plans Division with the General Staff Corps in Washington, D.C. from August 1937 to April 1941. He next served as commanding officer of the 36th Infantry Regiment, which was activated 15 April 1941, as the 36th Infantry (Armored) and assigned to the 3rd Armored Division, June 1941; on 1 January 1942, it was redesignated the 36th Armored Infantry.

General Patton with members of his staff. Walker is standing on the right

When Marshall (now Chief of Staff) assigned George S. Patton to organize America's armored forces, Walker successfully lobbied Marshall for a post as one of Patton's subordinate commanders, gaining promotion to brigadier general in the process. Promoted to major general in 1942; he commanded the 3rd Armored Division from August 1941 to August 1942. After being succeeded by Leroy H. Watson, Walker became commanding general of IV Corps and then XX Corps (IV Armored Corps became XX Corps), taking the latter to England in February 1944 and leading it into combat in Normandy in July as part of Patton's Third Army. He was awarded a Silver Star for gallantry in action on 7 July 1944. The citation for the medal read:

The President of the United States of America, authorized by Act of Congress, 9 July 1918, takes pleasure in presenting a Second Bronze Oak Leaf Cluster in lieu of a Third Award of the Silver Star Medal to Major General Walton Harris Walker (ASN: 0-3405), United States Army, for gallantry in action against the enemy. When Infantry troops of the XX Corps launched an attack across the Vire River in the vicinity of Airel, 7 July 1944, and came under intensive enemy fire, General Walker made repeated visits to the disputed sector and exposed himself to mortar and artillery concentrations at the front in order to encourage the officers and men making the crossing. By his personal gallantry, he expedited the vital assault and contributed to the establishment of the bridgehead. General Walker's conduct reflects credit upon himself and the military service.

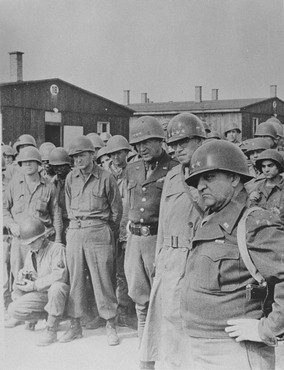
Senior American commanders tour the newly liberated Ohrdruf concentration camp, 1945. Pictured from right to left are Walton Walker, Omar Bradley and George S. Patton

Walker's XX Corps played a role in Patton's dash across France in August and early September 1944, earning the sobriquet "Ghost Corps" for the speed of its advance. He received the Distinguished Service Cross (DSC) for extraordinary heroism on 23 August 1944, the citation for which read:

The President of the United States of America, authorized by Act of Congress, 9 July 1918, takes pleasure in presenting the Distinguished Service Cross to Major General Walton Harris Walker (ASN: 0-3405), United States Army, for extraordinary heroism in connection with military operations against an armed enemy of the United States. On 23 August 1944, Maj General Walker, Commanding General, XX United States Army Corps, with complete disregard for his own safety, personally directed the successful operation which established a bridgehead across the Seine River near Melun, France. By his continuous presence with the forward elements of his command, as well as exemplary judgment and leadership, he inspired his command in effecting an early crossing of the Seine River and the continuance of the attack eastward. General Walker's contact with the forward combat troops was maintained in the face of heavy enemy fire. He repeatedly exposed himself to this enemy fire, encouraging the troops to move forward and by doing so gave them the required confidence to continue their advance. When certain elements were halted by intense enemy fire, he courageously assumed personal command and through his own supervision, force and persuasion, although he himself was in complete view of the enemy, caused the troops to effect the crossing of the river. By his intrepid direction, heroic leadership and superior tactical knowledge and ability, General Walker set an inspiring example for his command, reflecting the highest traditions of the armed forces.

Walker's troops saw heavy fighting in France and Germany during the remainder of the war, especially at Metz, the Battle of the Bulge, and in the invasion of Germany. In the spring of 1945, XX Corps liberated Buchenwald concentration camp, then pushed south and east, eventually reaching Linz, Austria by May. Walker received his third star at this time, making him a lieutenant general.

Walker received the unconditional surrender of Generaloberst Lothar Rendulic, commander of German Army Group South, on 7 May 1945. For his service as commander of XX Corps from 1944 to 1945, he was awarded the Legion of Merit.

== Post-World War II ==
In May 1945, Walker returned to the United States to take up command of the Eighth Service Command, headquartered in Dallas. After twelve months, he was assigned as the commander of the Sixth Service Command and the Fifth Army, headquartered in Chicago, from May 1946 to September 1948, and then became commanding general of the U.S. Eighth Army, the American occupation force in Japan. Walker was ordered by General Douglas MacArthur, the Supreme Allied Commander in Japan, to restore the peacetime Eighth Army to combat-ready condition.

== Korean War ==
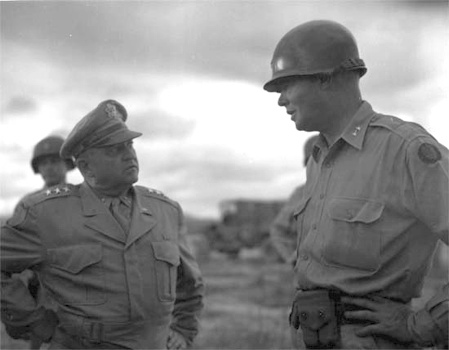
Lt. Gen. Walker (left) confers with Maj. Gen. William F. Dean, Commander of the 24th Infantry Division, 7 July 1950

At the end of World War II, Korea was divided into Soviet and American occupation zones. North Korea, backed by the Soviet Union, became the Democratic People's Republic of Korea in 1948, while South Korea became the Republic of Korea that same year. China became the communist People's Republic of China in 1949. In 1950, the Soviet Union backed North Korea while the United States backed South Korea, and China allied with the Soviet Union in what was to become the first military action of the Cold War.

Shortly after 75,000 North Korean troops with tanks invaded South Korea on 25 June 1950, American air and sea forces were ordered by President Harry S. Truman to give South Korean troops support. The U.S. Eighth Army was ordered to intervene and drive the invaders back across the 38th parallel, the border between the two countries. With only four lightly equipped and poorly trained divisions, Walker began landing troops on the southeast side of the Korean peninsula in July. After his lead units, elements of the 24th Infantry Division (including the ill-fated Task Force Smith), were virtually destroyed in a few days of furious fighting between Osan and Taejon, Walker realized his assigned mission was impossible and went on the defensive. Pushed steadily back towards the southeast by the North Korean advance, Walker's forces suffered heavy losses and for a time were unable to form a defensible front, even after bringing the 1st Cavalry Division and 25th Infantry Division into the fight.

Walker’s situation was complicated by MacArthur’s orders from Tokyo for him not to retreat an inch. Attempting to obey, Walker gave a bombastic "not a step back" speech to his staff and subordinate commanders which did not go over well. Nor did it stop the North Korean troops from pushing back American and South Korean troops, which had been badly mauled in the opening days of the invasion, even further. As American and South Korean forces retreated further east and south, they finally arrived at a defensible line on the Nakdong River. They took advantage of shortened supply routes and a relatively good road network to exploit the advantages of interior lines. Walker was able to quickly shift his units from point to point, stopping North Korean attacks before the attacking forces could be reinforced.

A critical advantage Walker had was signals intelligence produced by the U.S. Armed Forces Security Agency (now the National Security Agency). This data enabled Walker to gain an indication of North Korean Army movements prior to attacks. Walker kept his main units deployed on the front lines, while retaining other U.S. Army and Marine Corps forces as a mobile reserve. His ability to better interpret North Korean intentions allowed him and his staff to better position his forces along the perimeter. It also allowed him to employ artillery and airpower more effectively.

American military forces gradually solidified this defensive position on the southeast side of the Korean peninsula, dubbed the "Pusan Perimeter". Walker received reinforcements, including the Provisional Marine Brigade, which he used along with the Army's 27th Infantry Regiment as "fire brigades," reliable troops who specialized in counterattacking and wiping out enemy penetrations. As more reinforcements arrived, the combat advantage shifted toward the United Nations forces. North Korean forces had suffered terribly and their supply lines were under constant aerial bombardment. Almost all of their Russian-made T-34 tanks, which had spearheaded the invasion, had been destroyed. Walker ordered local counterattacks, while planning for a large-scale breakout in conjunction with MacArthur's planned landing at Inchon in September.

With MacArthur's amphibious flanking move, the North Koreans seemed trapped, but Walker's rapid advance northwest towards Inchon and Seoul emphasized speed over maneuver and made no attempt to encircle and destroy the North Koreans after punching through their lines. Although thousands of prisoners were taken, many North Korean units successfully disengaged from the fighting, melting away into the interior of South Korea, where they would conduct a guerrilla war for two years. Others escaped all the way back to North Korea. Walker was awarded the Distinguished Service Cross for extraordinary heroism from 14 July to 28 September 1950. The medal's citation read:

The President of the United States of America, under the provisions of the Act of Congress approved 9 July 1918, takes pleasure in presenting a Bronze Oak Leaf Cluster in lieu of a Second Award of the Distinguished Service Cross to Lieutenant General Walton Harris Walker (ASN: 0-3405), United States Army, for extraordinary heroism in connection with military operations against an armed enemy of the United Nations while serving as Commanding General of the 8th United States Army. Lieutenant General Walker distinguished himself by extraordinary heroism in action against enemy aggressor forces in the Republic of Korea from 14 July to 28 September 1950. During this campaign General Walker personally, and at great risk to his own life from enemy ground fire, performed repeated aerial reconnaissance flights in unarmed plane deep into enemy territory. The knowledge gained by General Walker from these flights was of inestimable value to him in making tactical decisions, and contributed greatly to the accomplishment of his mission in spite of the preponderance of force possessed by the enemy. In addition to the above and with personal disregard not only of health of but life itself, he spent hour after hour and day after day on the battlefield, inspiring the United Nations forces with his own courage and his will to fight. Where acts of personal courage were common, General Walker's fearlessness and courageous leadership were outstanding.

With the war apparently won, Walker's Eighth Army quickly moved north and, with the independent X Corps on its right, crossed the 38th parallel to occupy North Korea. Fighting tapered off to sporadic, sharp clashes with remnants of North Korean forces. By late October 1950, the Eighth Army was nearing the Yalu River, on the border between North Korea and China. MacArthur's headquarters had assured Walker that the Chinese would not intervene, so Walker's troops did not maintain watchful security. A gap opened between Eighth Army and X Corps as they advanced close to the Chinese border due to a lack of coordination between Walker, General Edward Almond, Commander of the X Corps, and MacArthur's headquarters in Tokyo. Eventually, the weather turned extremely cold, and most American units had no training and inadequate equipment for these bitter temperatures.

Contrary to MacArthur's expectations, the Chinese intervened in force on November 25, first in a series of ambushes, then in sporadic night attacks, and finally in an all-out offensive in which three Chinese armies infiltrated the lines, taking advantage of the American failure to take basic security measures, and the large gaps between American and South Korean units and between the Eighth Army and the X Corps. From late October until the beginning of December in 1950, the Chinese killed or captured thousands of American and ROK soldiers, decimating the 2nd Infantry Division and forcing Walker into a desperate retreat.

By early December, using his superior mobility, Walker successfully broke contact with the Chinese, withdrawing south to a position around Pyongyang, the capital of North Korea. Without instructions from MacArthur's headquarters, Walker concluded that the Eighth Army was too battered to defend Pyongyang and ordered it to continue its retreat south of the 38th parallel, saving most of the Eighth Army.

== Death and burial ==
Walker was killed in a traffic accident on 23 December 1950, in Dobong District, Seoul (near Uijeongbu), South Korea, when his north-bound command jeep collided with a south-bound weapons carrier from a South Korean army division that had swung out of its lane. His body was escorted back to the United States by his son Sam Sims Walker, then a Company commander with the 19th Infantry Regiment, who was also serving in Korea. On 2 January 1951, he was posthumously promoted to full general and his body was interred in Section 34 of Arlington National Cemetery.

== Military awards and badges ==
Walker's decorations and awards, and badges, include:

Distinguished Service Cross w/ bronze oak leaf cluster
Distinguished Service Medal w/ bronze oak leaf cluster
Silver Star w/ two bronze oak leaf clusters
Legion of Merit
Distinguished Flying Cross w/ bronze oak leaf cluster
Bronze Star Medal
Air Medal w/ two silver and one bronze oak leaf cluster
Army Commendation Medal
World War I Victory Medal w/ three 3/16" bronze stars
Army of Occupation of Germany Medal
American Defense Service Medal
American Campaign Medal
European-African-Middle Eastern Campaign Medal w/ one 3/16" silver star and one 3/16" bronze star
World War II Victory Medal
Army of Occupation Medal
National Defense Service Medal
Korean Service Medal w/ three 3/16" bronze stars
French Croix de Guerre w/ bronze star and palm
Order of the Patriotic War First Class (USSR)
Republic of Korea Order of Military Merit, Second Class
Republic of Korea Presidential Unit Citation
United Nations Service Medal for Korea
Republic of Korea War Service Medal

Badges

Army Staff Identification Badge

== Military promotions ==
Source – Official Register of the United States Army. 1946. pg. 713

No insignia	Cadet, United States Military Academy: 15 June 1907
No pin insignia in 1912	Second Lieutenant, Regular Army: 12 June 1912
	First Lieutenant, Regular Army: 1 July 1916
	Captain, Regular Army: 17 May 1917
	Major, National Army: 7 June 1918
	Lieutenant Colonel, National Army: 6 May 1919
	Captain, Regular Army: 12 February 1920
	Major, Regular Army: 1 July 1920
	Lieutenant Colonel, Regular Army: 1 August 1935
	Colonel, Army of the United States: 14 February 1941
	Brigadier General, Army of the United States: 10 July 1941
	Major General, Army of the United States: 16 February 1942
	Colonel, Regular Army: 1 May 1942
	Lieutenant General, Army of the United States: 15 April 1945
	Major General, Regular Army: 1 August 1947
	General, Regular Army (posthumous): 2 January 1951

== Legacy and honors ==
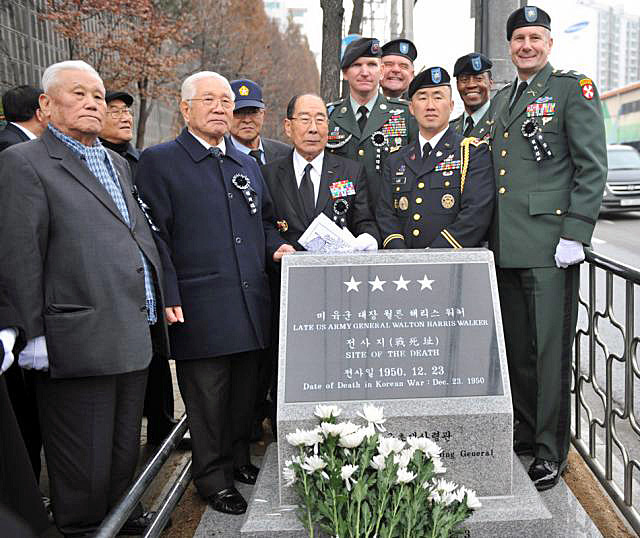
Walton H. Walker monument, Dobong, Seoul, 2009

Promoted posthumously to 4-star General, Walker's memory was much honored in the years immediately following the Korean War. The Army chose his name (and his other nickname), for its next light tank, the M41 Walker Bulldog. The M41 Tank was already nicknamed the Little Bulldog before Gen. Walker's death. The Army dropped the word Little and retained the name Bulldog as part of the new nickname for the M41 Tank.

In Dallas, Texas, the western segment of Texas State Highway Loop 12 was named after him (the portion going through neighboring Irving, Texas continues the naming convention). In Belton, Texas, American Legion Post 55 is named after him. One of the largest Armed Forces Recreation Center's hotels, the General Walker Hotel in Berchtesgaden (now demolished), was also named in his honor. Camp Walker in Daegu, South Korea, is named in his honor.

In 1963, South Korea President Park Chung Hee honored Walker by naming a hill in the southern part of Seoul after him. Today, Walker Hill is the site of the Grand Walker Hill, a five-star international resort and hotel with its own full service casino. Also, Walker Hill Apartment is located in Gwangjin-gu. In December 2009, the mayor of Dobong-gu district, Choi Sun-Kil, unveiled the Walton Harris Walker monument to mark the site of his death. The memorial, which is near Dobong subway Station, pays tribute to Walker and to all those who defended South Korea in the Korean War.

Walker Intermediate School which is located on the Fort Knox Army Garrison, was named after Walker and opened in 1962. His picture hangs in the school lobby. A biography of Walker was published in 2008 titled General Walton H. Walker: Forgotten Hero-The Man Who Saved Korea, by Charles M. Province.

== In popular culture ==
Walker was portrayed by Douglas Fowley in the 1963 film Miracle of the White Stallions, and by Garry Walberg in the 1977 film MacArthur.

== Bibliography ==
- General Walton H. Walker: A Talent for Training. CreateSpace Independent Publishing Platform. 14 August 2014. ISBN 978-1-5008-3079-3.
- Blair Jr., Clay (2003). The Forgotten War (Reprint ed.). Naval Institute Press. ISBN 1-59114-075-7.
- Fehrenbach, T.R. (2001). This Kind of War: A Study in Unpreparedness (50th Anniversary ed.). New York: Macmillan. ISBN 1-57488-334-8.
- Halberstam, David (2007). The Coldest Winter: American and the Korean War. New York: Hyperion. ISBN 978-1-4013-0052-4.
- Heefner, Wilson Allen (2001). Patton's Bulldog: The Life and Service of General Walton H. Walker. White Mane Books. ISBN 978-1572492837.
- Tucker, Spencer C., ed. (2002). Encyclopedia of the Korean War: A Political, Social and Military History (New ed.). Santa Barbara: Checkmark Books. ISBN 0-8160-4682-4.
- Monument unveiled for legendary U.S. Army general
- Sandler, Stanley (1995). The Korean War, an Encyclopedia. New York: Garland Publishing. ISBN 0-8240-4445-2.
- Taaffe, Stephen R. (2013). Marshall and His Generals: U.S. Army Commanders in World War II. Lawrence, Kansas: University Press of Kansas. ISBN 978-0-7006-1942-9. OCLC 840162019.
- Taaffe, Stephen (2016). MacArthur's Korean War Generals. Lincoln, KN: University Press of Kansas. ISBN 978-0-7006-2221-4. JSTOR j.ctt1qnw7ct.
- Province, Charles M. (2008). General Walton H. Walker: Forgotten Hero - The Man Who Saved Korea. CreateSpace. ISBN 978-1440472886.

Military offices
Preceded by Alvan Cullom Gillem Jr.	Commanding General 3rd Armored Division; January−August 1942	Succeeded by Leroy H. Watson
Preceded by Newly activated organization	Commanding General Fifth United States Army; 1946−1948	Succeeded by Stephen J. Chamberlin
Preceded by Robert L. Eichelberger	Commanding General Eighth Army; 1948–1950	Succeeded by Matthew Ridgway
