= Kampfhäusl =

Former building in Germany

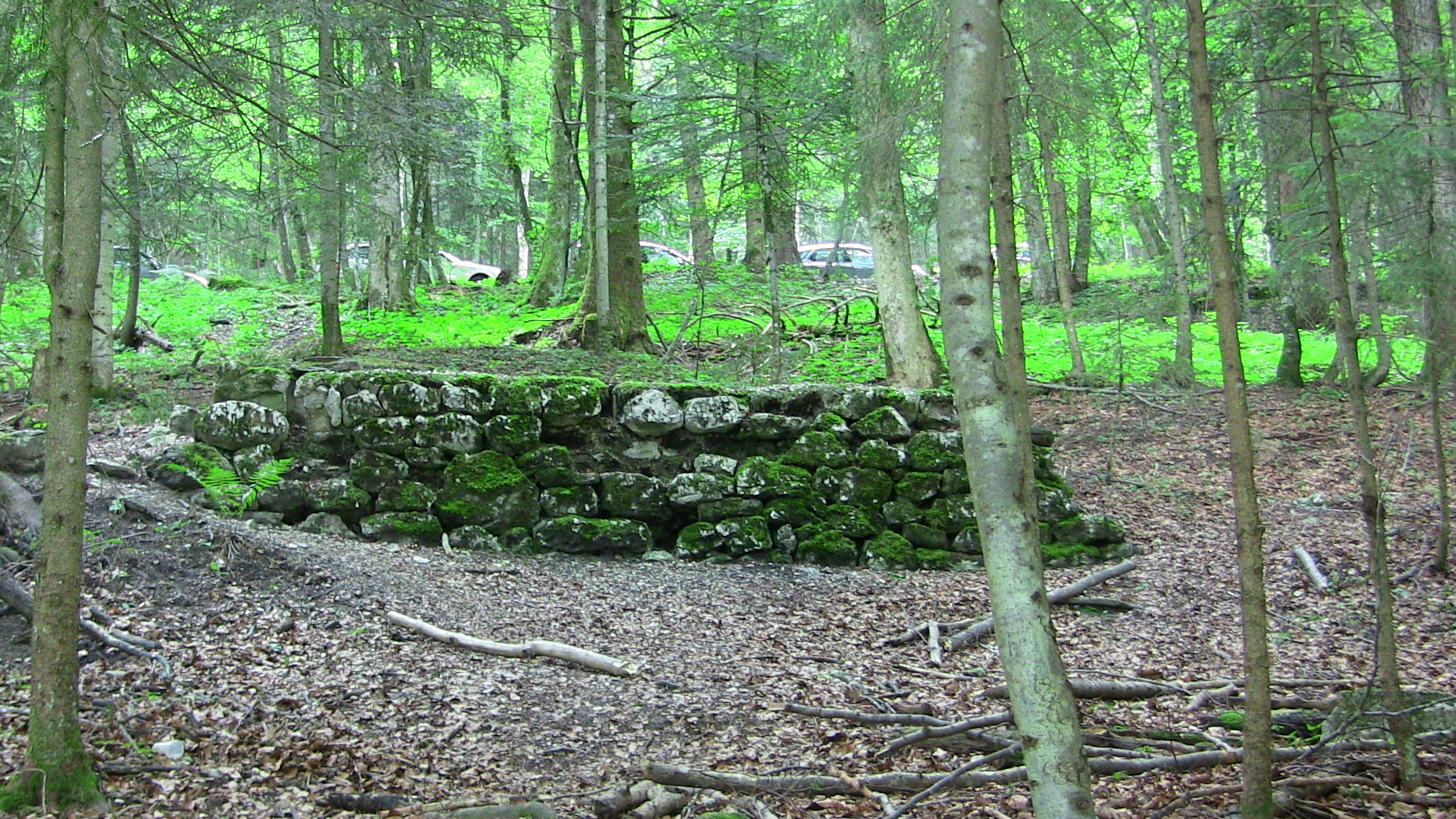
Remains of the cabin in 2019.

The Kampfhäusl (German for "[My] Struggle House") was a small log cabin on the forest property of the former Gebirgskurhauses Obersalzberg (formerly the Pension Moritz; from 1928: Platterhof) in Obersalzberg. The cabin was the location where Adolf Hitler wrote the second volume of Mein Kampf (My Struggle).

== History ==
Dietrich Eckart visited Obersalzberg for the first time in May 1923. The Hitler trial resulted in a minimum sentence of five years in Landsberg Prison, where he dictated the first volume of Mein Kampf to his later deputy Rudolf Hess (according to Joachim Fest, the first volume was only dictated by Hitler in Obersalzberg after his imprisonment, like the second). Hitler was released on parole early in December 1924. This volume was then published in a first edition on July 18, 1925.

In the summer of the same year, after his release from prison, he was a guest under the name "Hugo Wolf" in the Gebirgskurhaus Obersalzberg, which was then leased by Bruno Büchner and his wife. In a small log cabin that stood a little above it on the forest property belonging to the guesthouse, as well as in the Deutsches Haus hotel, he dictated the second part of his manuscript of Mein Kampf to Max Amann, who was his Vizefeldwebel during the First World War. Because of these writings, the Kampfhäusl was given its name by Hitler's supporters.

The Alpengasthof Steiner below the guesthouse where Hitler lived served as a post office in Obersalzberg. Thekla Rasp, the wife of the inn owner, remembers “Dr. Wolf" as follows:

My husband [Steffl] is there no time with the mail. He [Hitler] was already working on “Mein Kampf”. And then he said: “Steffl, you should get one of the first ones.” And so he got the book, with his own dedication.

— Thekla Rasp

When Mein Kampf was written, the furnishings in the hut only included a tiled stove, a table, a chair and a bed. In the summer of 1928, after the Büchners had purchased the guesthouse and renamed it Pension Platterhof, Hitler also wrote down “his thoughts on German foreign policy” in the log cabin.

According to German author Ulrich Chaussy, the log cabin was dismantled after 1945 and, according to historian Rainer Blasius, demolished in 1951. Today only remnants of its foundation remain.
