= Edelweiss Lodge and Resort =

Recreation hotel in Garmisch-Partenkirchen, Germany

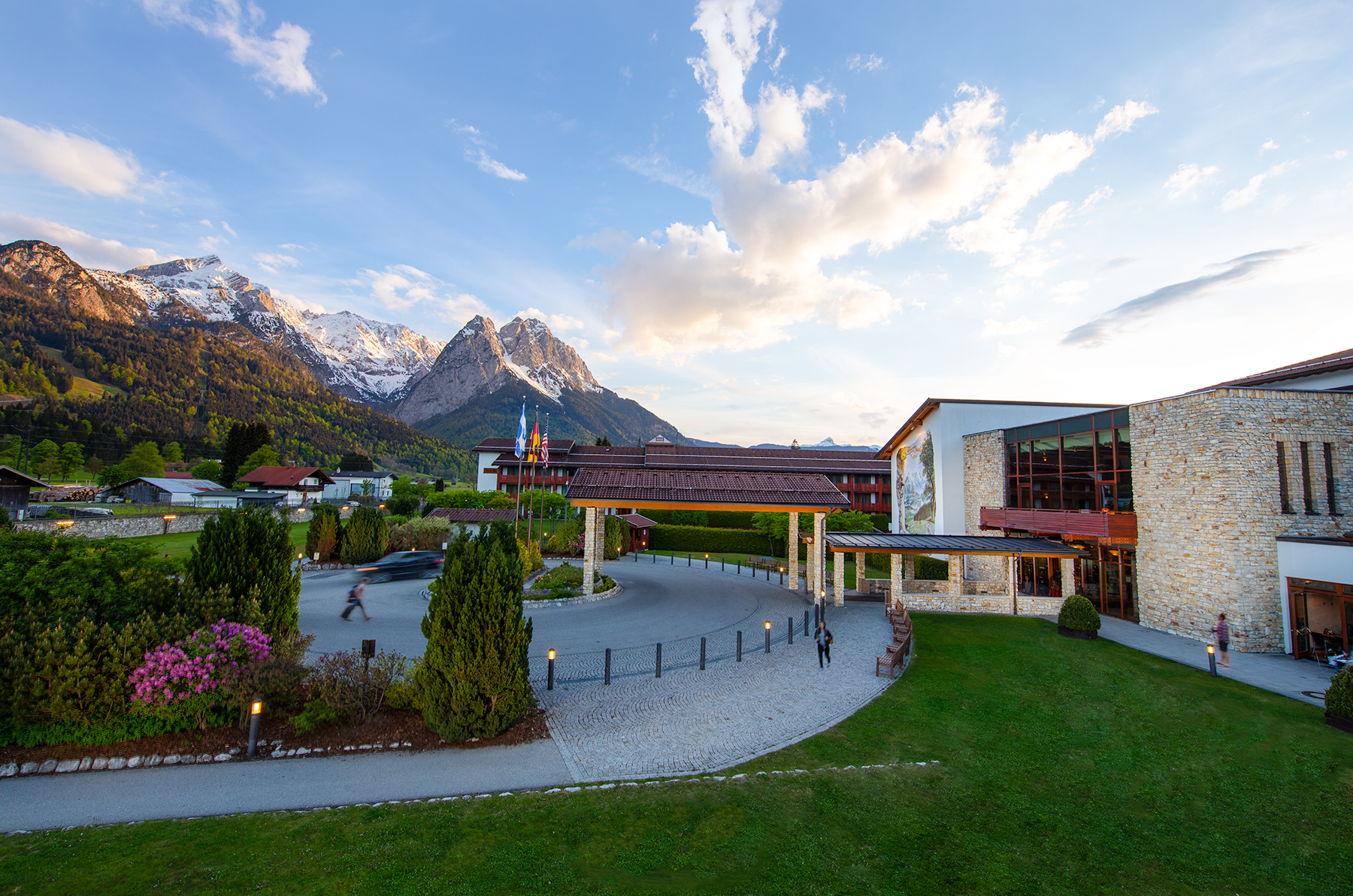
- Mountain view from the main entrance in 2019
- Interactive map of the Edelweiss Lodge and Resort area

General information
- Location: Garmisch-Partenkirchen, Germany
- Coordinates: 47.484°N 11.067°E
- Opening: September 2004
- Owner: United States Department of Defense
- Operator: Armed Forces Recreation Centers

Other information
- Number of rooms: 246
- Number of restaurants: 3

Website
- edelweisslodgeandresort.com

Edelweiss Lodge and Resort is a U.S. Department of Defense owned recreation hotel in Garmisch-Partenkirchen, Germany operated by Armed Forces Recreation Centers. Located in the Bavarian Alps near the Austrian border, the facility opened in September 2004 at a cost of US$80 million.

Due to international agreements, the use of the Commissary, Community Bank and PX/BX are limited to personnel assigned to US Forces in Europe and NATO ID card holders who have this privilege. This includes rationed items such as gas coupons. Gas prices are considerably higher compared to US standards. Military Post Offices may be used only by retirees who reside in Germany for over 30 days and who have Box R privileges with restrictions. Alpine Adventures is located in Edelweiss Lodge and Resort and has an array of Bavarian items and other souvenirs.

== History ==
Edelweiss Lodge and Resort was built to replace a series of older Armed Forces Recreation Center (AFRC) hotels (General Patton Hotel and General Von Steuben in Garmisch-Partenkirchen). Other hotels throughout the AFRC Resort history included the now-demolished General Walker Hotel in Obersalzberg.

Following the conclusion of the Second World War in Europe, a number of formerly German military hotels and resort complexes were taken over by the United States Army and put into use as R&R centers for the benefit of the soldiers stationed there. While these older hotels served this purpose well for many years, they also became expensive to continue to maintain. In the spring of 2000, the U.S. Army and members of the United States Congress approved plans to construct a modern resort hotel in the Bavarian resort town of Garmisch-Partenkirchen. Upon completion of the new hotel, AFRC-Europe closed AFRC-Chiemsee (Seehotel was a former Reichsautobahn Rest area "Rasthaus am Chiemsee" from Nazi times) and the General Patton Hotel in Garmisch-Partenkirchen, and consolidated the remaining AFRC facilities in Garmisch-Partenkirchen under the new Edelweiss Lodge and Resort. The Edelweiss Lodge and Resort was featured in the 2016 movie Eddie the Eagle. Scenes were filmed in the lobby one of the restaurants and the entrance to the conference room.

== Facilities ==
The hotel features 254 rooms and suites, a conference center, three restaurants with a variety of American and German dishes, and a fitness center including sauna and pool. The Edelweiss Lodge and Resort also operates the Hausberg Sport Lodge, a ski rental facility and ski school located next to the cable car station at the base of the Hausberg mountain.

The Edelweiss Lodge also operates the Edelweiss Vacation Village and Campground, located in the western part of Garmisch-Partenkirchen, on the nearby Artillery Kaserne. These facilities feature rustic cabins and a campground in the Loisach River Valley.

On a daily basis they offer guided tours to Dachau Concentration Camp, Neuschwanstein Castle, Partnach Gorge, Ettal Abbey and more.
