= Bolero (magazine) =

Swiss fashion magazine

- Editor-in-chief: Sabina Hanselmann-Diethelm
- Former editors: Sithara Atasoy
- Categories: Fashion magazine
- Frequency: Monthly
- Publisher: Ringier
- Founded: 1990; 36 years ago
- Country: Switzerland
- Based in: Zürich
- Language: German
- Website: www.boleromagazin.ch

Bolero is a fashion and lifestyle magazine based in Zürich, Switzerland. It has been in circulation since 1990 and published monthly.

== History ==
Bolero was established in 1990. The magazine is published by Ringier in German on a monthly basis.

Sithara Atasoy served as the editor-in-chief of Bolero. As of 2015 Sabina Hanselmann-Diethelm was the editor-in-chief of the magazine which had an edition for men, BoleroMen. BoleroMen ceased publication in 2018.

== Merger ==
In 2015 its sister magazine Edelweiss was merged into the magazine. Following the merge Bolero began to publish an additional French edition addressing women living in the French-speaking regions of Switzerland. This edition was based in Lausanne and was also published monthly. Its French edition folded in 2018.

In 2014 the circulation of Bolero was 33,111 copies.

== See also ==
- Annabelle (magazine)
