= Edelweiss (given name) =

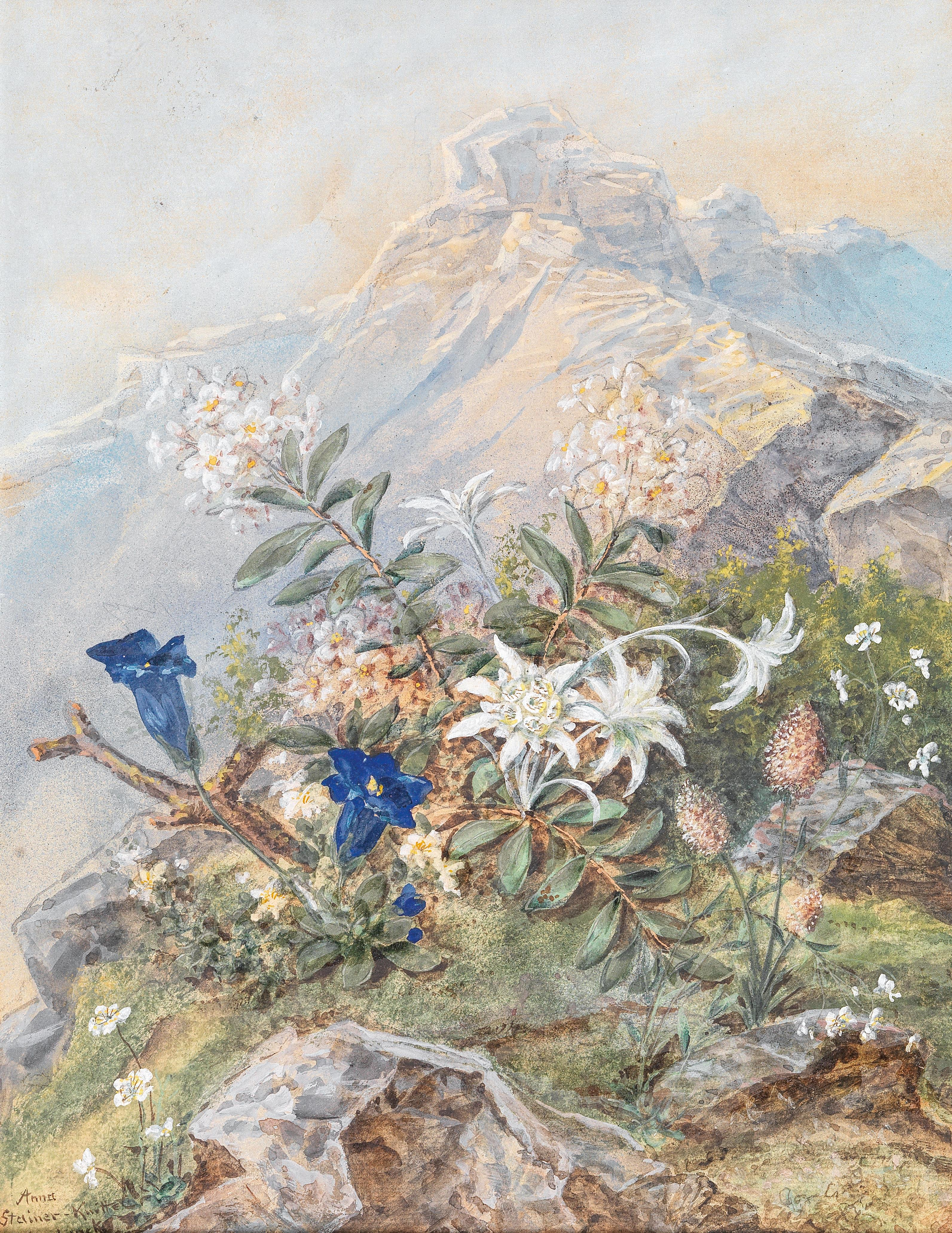
- Gentian and Edelweiss by Anna Stainer-Knittel, before 1915.
- Gender: Primarily female
- Language: German

Origin
- Meaning: edelweiss

Edelweiss is a given name derived from the flower.

== Women ==
- Edelweiss (actress) (born 1977), born Oxana, Russian-Bulgarian pornographic actress
- Edelweiss Cheung (born 1985), Hong Kong model and beauty pageant titleholder who was crowned Miss Hong Kong 2008
- Edel Quinn, baptized Edelweiss (1907-1944), Irish-born Roman Catholic lay-missionary and Envoy of the Legion of Mary to East Africa

== Men ==
- Edelweis Rodriguez (1911-1962), Italian boxer who competed in the 1932 Summer Olympics
