= Edelweiss (magazine) =

Women's magazine in Switzerland(1998-2015)

- Categories: Women's magazine
- Frequency: Monthly
- Publisher: Ringier AG
- Founded: 1998
- Final issue: 2015
- Company: Ringier
- Country: Switzerland
- Based in: Zürich; Lausanne
- Language: German

Edelweiss was a Swiss monthly women's magazine published in Zürich, Switzerland. The magazine was part of Ringier. It was among the best-selling women's magazines of Switzerland. It was in circulation between 1998 and 2015.

== History and profile ==
Edelweiss was launched by the media company Ringier Romandy in 1998. The magazine was published on a monthly basis. It was headquartered in Zurich and was printed in German. Later its headquarters was moved to Lausanne.

Laurence Desbordes was appointed editor in chief in 2005. In 2008 a sister magazine of Edelweiss, Edelweiss Men, was started. In 2013 Edelweiss sold 19,048 copies. In 2014 its readers were 62,000.

In May 2014 Alexandre Lanz was named as the editor-in-chief of the magazine. In 2015 Edelweiss merged into Bolero, its sister magazine.
