= Above the Treeline =

- A search performed on the Edelweiss platform for Random House Spring 2017 Hardback titles under the Del Rey Books imprint.
- Industry: Book publishing
- Founded: 2002; 23 years ago
- Founder: John Rubin
- Headquarters: Ann Arbor, Michigan, USA
- Area served: Worldwide
- Services: Edelweiss+ and Edelweiss+Analytics - publisher digital catalogs, print and digital review copies, publisher marketing, bookstore inventory management tools, library collection development tools, reviews
- Owner: Valsoft Corporation
- Website: abovethetreeline.com

Above the Treeline is an American company behind the Edelweiss+ platform, which provides many services that support the book industry. In 2024, it was acquired by the Montreal-based Valsoft Corporation.

== History ==
Above the Treeline was founded in Ann Arbor, Michigan, in 2002 by John Rubin. By laying off 15% of its Edelweiss workforce by 2025, the firm stated this was due to "realigning the business around new strategic initiatives.

== Edelweiss+ ==
Edelweiss+Analytics is an add-on module available to publishers, bookstores, and libraries that provides additional functionality and decision intelligence for users.

Publishers use Edelweiss+ to share digital catalogs and title information, communicate with bookstores and other book professionals, market their titles, analyze their sales, and share review copies to generate reviews and sales.

Bookstores use Edelweiss+ to learn about new titles, communicate with sales reps, place orders, and manage their inventory. Libraries use Edelweiss+ to learn about new titles, communicate with publishers, and manage their collection.

Other book professionals, such as reviewers, publicists, agencies, and the media also use Edelweiss+ to learn about new titles. Basic user accounts are free. The platform is used by over 120,000 book professionals.

The website hosts digital catalogs from all major US publishers, select international publishers, and includes 95% of the US frontlist titles. Users may search by publisher and catalog or across all publishers. Judith Rosen of Publishers Weekly noted that the adoption of Edelweiss+ and rise of digital catalogs has changed the way the book industry works.
