= Camp Holcomb =

US military base in Qinhuangdao, China

- Qinhuangdao, China

Location
- Coordinates: 39°53′59.5″N 119°32′51.3″E

Site history
- Built: 1912

Garrison information
- Garrison: 15th Infantry Regiment (US Army), US Marine Corps

Camp Holcomb was a US military base in Qinhuangdao, China. Established in 1912 in response to the Boxer Rebellion, it was garrisoned by the 15th Infantry Regiment, US Army as part of their larger presence in nearby Tianjin. Qinhuangdao is a strategic deep water port near where the Great Wall of China meets the sea. Called Camp Burrowes by the Army, on February 28, 1938, the base was transferred to the US Marine Corps and renamed Camp Holcomb after the Commandant of the Marine Corps, General Thomas Holcomb The base was surrendered to the Japanese on December 8, 1941. After World War II, the base was again used by the Marines until 1947, when it was caught up in the Chinese Civil War and evacuated.

There is a possibility that Camp Holcomb is the location of the missing Peking Man fossils. The fossils were being shipped to Tianjin in November 1941, and the ship that was tasked with transporting them, the President Harrison, could not have docked at Tianjin itself. The ship never arrived, and the bones were lost. In a story relayed many years later to his son, a US Marine digging foxholes during 1947 when the base was under attack by Chinese Communists found a box full of bones but reburied it.
