= General Walker Hotel =

Coordinates: 47.6305°N 13.0413°E

- Interactive map of the General Walker Hotel area

General information
- Type: Hotel
- Location: Obersalzberg, Germany
- Demolished: 2001

The General Walker Hotel was a hotel for US troops after World War II in the mountain (Alpine) retreat of Obersalzberg, Germany. The former Pension Moritz boarding house, boasting opulent accommodations and sweeping views of the Bavarian countryside and Alpine scenery, had been opened in 1878 and renamed Platterhof in 1928. After the Nazi seizure of power, it became a "people's" hostel for visitors to the extended containment area around Hitler's headquarters at the nearby Berghof residence. It was subsequently rebuilt into a luxury hotel for visiting dignitaries and in 1943 was converted into a military hospital.

Following World War II, the damaged building was restored as a United States Armed Forces Recreation Center (AFRC), and again renamed after US Army General Walton Walker (1889–1950), killed in action in the Korean War. The complex was demolished in 2001.

== History ==
On 10 September 1877, the landlady Mauritia Mayer (1833–1897) purchased the former Steinhaus farmstead in Obersalzberg above Berchtesgaden. Receiving financial support from well-off friends such as the physician Theodor Weber, she had it rebuilt as a boarding house named Pension Moritz, after her nickname. Mayer pioneered tourism in the Berchtesgaden area; her lodge quickly became popular with notable guests such as the writer Richard Voss, a longtime friend, the musicians Clara Schumann, Johannes Brahms, and Joseph Joachim, the poets Peter Rosegger and Ludwig Ganghofer, the painters Ludwig Knaus and Franz von Lenbach, and the industrialist Carl von Linde. Upon Mauritia's death, the hotel establishment was continued by her younger sister Antonie, who finally sold it in 1919.

The next year, the pension was leased to the former racing cyclist Bruno Büchner (1871–1943). In 1923, Adolf Hitler first visited Obersalzberg, where Büchner accommodated the Nazi journalist Dietrich Eckart. Again in summer 1925, Hitler, released from prison in Landsberg, was a boarder at the Pension Moritz; he and his party fellow Max Amann completed the manuscript of Mein Kampf in a small cabin on the premises. Hitler became a regular guest; from 1928, he rented the nearby Haus Wachenfeld chalet, which later was rebuilt as the Berghof. Bruno Büchner acquired the Pension Moritz in 1928 and renamed it Platterhof, inspired by Richard Voss' popular novel Zwei Menschen, which had been filmed a few years before. However, when Hitler became Reich Chancellor in January 1933 and his legal secretary Martin Bormann gradually had the Obersalzberg resort turned into a restricted area, Büchner ran into difficulties. He experienced losses due to numerous defamatory statements and intrigues, until his hotel was finally closed by SS personnel and the Nazi Party took possession of the Platterhof on 20 June 1936. Büchner received a small compensation and was forced to leave Obersalzberg.

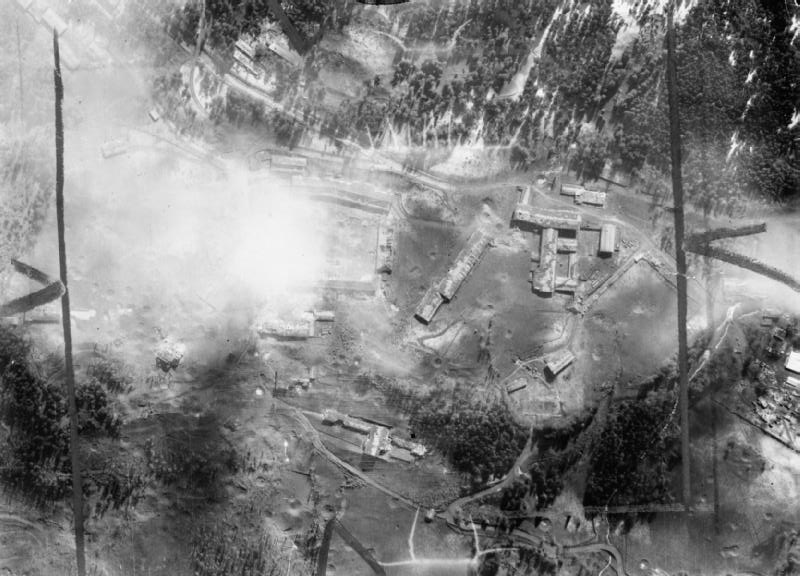
Aerial view of Obersalzberg during the RAF air raid on 25 April 1945, Platterhof on the right

Initially a hostel for Nazi faithful, the building became a hotel for visiting dignitaries; the entire hotel was renovated and large parts of the complex were torn down. The only exception was the original ground floor of the old pension. A skyline room was added in 1937 and additional renovations were completed in 1941. It became one of the most modern and luxurious hotels in Europe, run by the Kraft durch Freude ("Strength Through Joy") organisation. Additionally, as part of the renovations and construction, the Platterhof was connected to other official buildings and retreats used by the Nazis through a series of bunkers and tunnels.

Designed to be a national hotel, it served primarily as a secluded sanctuary for high-ranking Nazi dignitaries and high-profile guests. It was guarded by machine guns and contained an air raid shelter. Parties and state functions were hosted at the Platterhof, and it was valued for the landscape and protection offered by the surrounding Alps. By 1943, however, the direction of the war required that the hotel complex be used as a military convalescence hospital.

== Postwar ==
Following the Obersalzberg air raid by a RAF Lancaster command on 25 April 1945, the heavily damaged Platterhof stood vacant and crumbling for a number of years. The US Army rebuilt the hotel in 1952 and together with the neighbouring former studio of Minister Albert Speer (Evergreen Lodge) designated it an Armed Forces Recreation Center. Many original fixtures, furnishings and design pieces taken from the Platterhof, and other notable Nazi buildings in the area were used in the reconstruction and the hotel, now renamed after General Walker, was again restored to its status as one of Europe's grandest hotels.

The General Walker Hotel remained in operation until the withdrawal of the US forces and the return of the property to the State of Bavaria in 1996. The US military had come to the decision to close and consolidate all of the AFRC hotels in southern Germany into one central facility in Garmisch-Partenkirchen, the Edelweiss Lodge and Resort, opened in 2004. The Bavarian state government resumed old plans to have a luxury hotel erected at Obersalzberg. Prior to the General Walker hotel's final destruction in 2001, many of the historical and highly valuable furnishings and fixtures were plundered from the abandoned building.

Today only small remnants of the hotel complex are still visible, such as a low-rise annex built in 1940/41 according to plans by Hermann Giesler, terraces and open staircases designed by Roderich Fick, as well as a section of wall from the skyline room. The original site of the hotel has been turned into a parking lot of the Dokumentation Obersalzberg museum.
