= Edelweiss Vacation Village and Campground =

Coordinates: 47.483°N 11.060°E

The Edelweiss Vacation Village and Campground is a United States Department of Defense recreational facility that is a part of the Edelweiss Lodge and Resort in Garmisch, Germany. The Vacation Village and Campground consists of a collection of deluxe and rustic wood cabins located on Artillery Kaserne in Southern Garmisch, and a gravel campsite in the Loisach River Valley. The Tent and Gravel Campsites are closed from October to Mid-May, but the cabins are open all year round.
