= Dokumentationszentrum Obersalzberg =

Dokumentation Obersalzberg
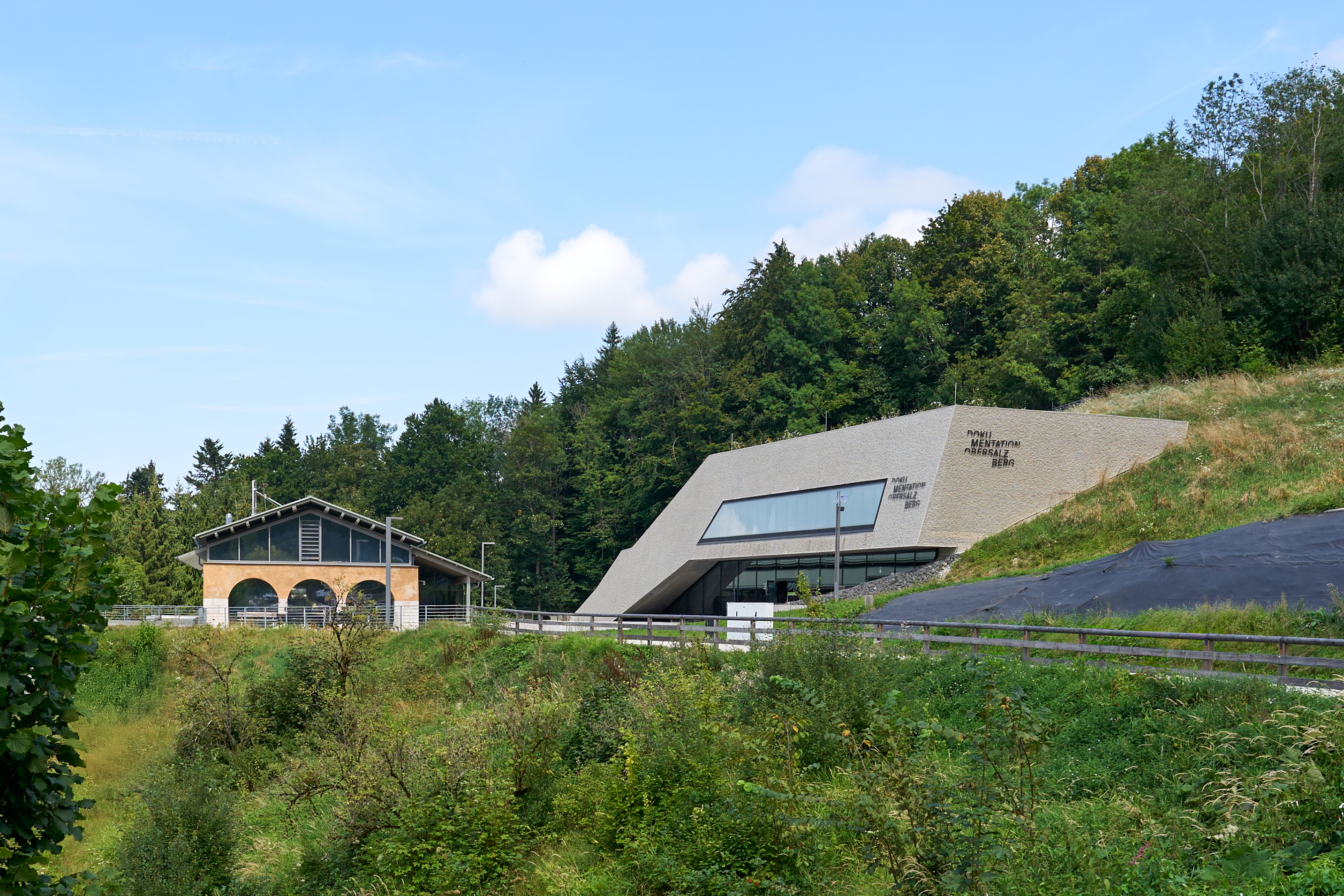
- Dokumentation Obersalzberg in 2024
- Established: 1999
- Location: Obersalzberg
- Coordinates: 47°37′54″N 13°02′25″E
- Type: Museum
- Visitors: 1 million (by 2007)

Dokumentation Obersalzberg is a museum in the Obersalzberg resort near Berchtesgaden, providing information on the use of the mountainside retreat by Nazi leaders, especially Adolf Hitler, who regularly spent time in this area beginning in 1928. The museum was opened in 1999, and by 2007 had been visited by more than one million people.

== Historic site ==
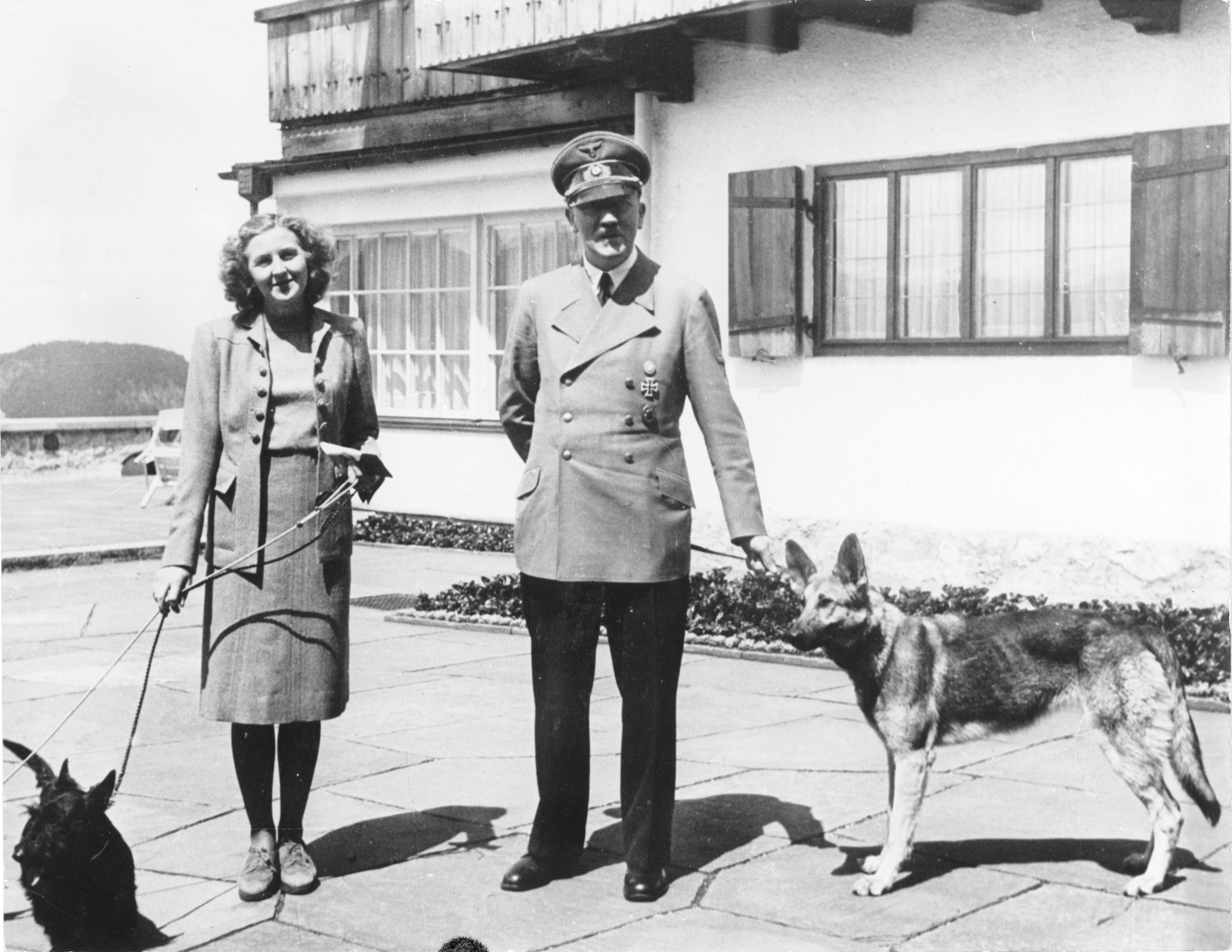
Hitler and Eva Braun on the terrace of the Berghof, 1942

Located in the German state of Bavaria, close to the Austrian border, Obersalzberg in the 19th century was one of the earliest tourist destinations in the Berchtesgaden Alps. That changed, when Hitler purchased the Berghof (Mountain House) residence upon the Nazi seizure of power in 1933 and a large area was cordoned off and evacuated. After World War II, the premises were handed over to the State of Bavaria, but they remained occupied by a United States Armed Forces recreation center and the General Walker Hotel for US troops, which had been the original Platterhof luxury hotel that had been used by the Nazis. The hotel was demolished in 2001.

The nearby Hotel Türken, which was often used by the SS, was badly damaged in 1945. It was rebuilt in 1950 and reopened as a hotel before Christmas that year. Visitors can still explore the historic underground hallways and tunnels that had been used by the Nazis. Access to the bunkers was closed for construction in September 2017 and remained closed in July 2018 "until further notice".

After the withdrawal of the US forces in 1996, the Bavarian state government resumed its plans to have a luxury hotel erected, but also the documentation center on the Nazi past to prevent the reopened area from becoming a pilgrimage site for Neo-Nazis. The hotel (originally the InterContinental and now the Kempinski Hotel Berchtesgaden) was built at the former site of Göring's residence.

The museum itself sits on the foundation of the Hoher Göll guesthouse. Also, a tunnel to the extended bunker complex exists at the demolished General Walker Hotel (former Platterhof), constructed in 1943–45.

== Exhibitions ==
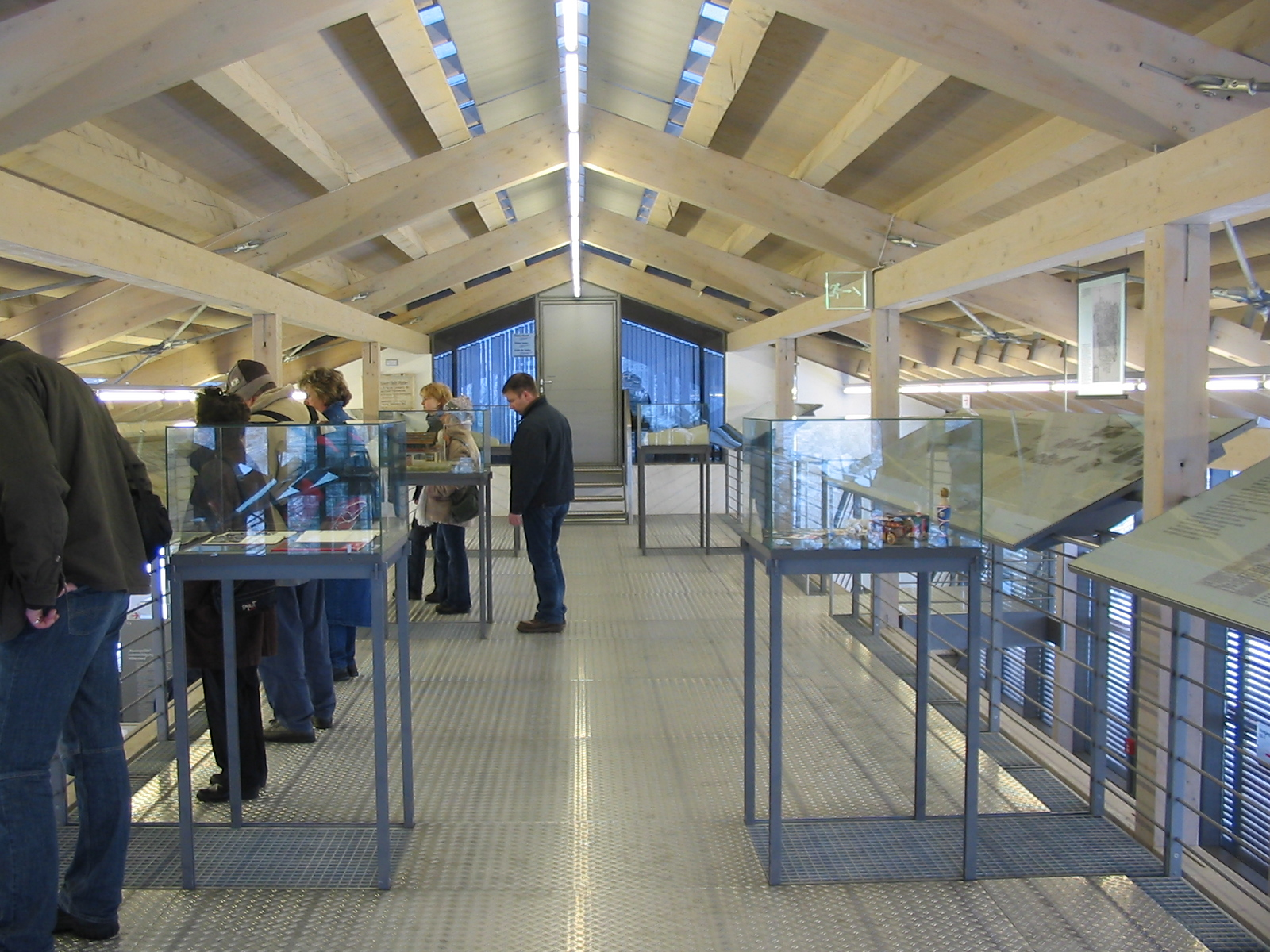
The upper floor of the exhibition area

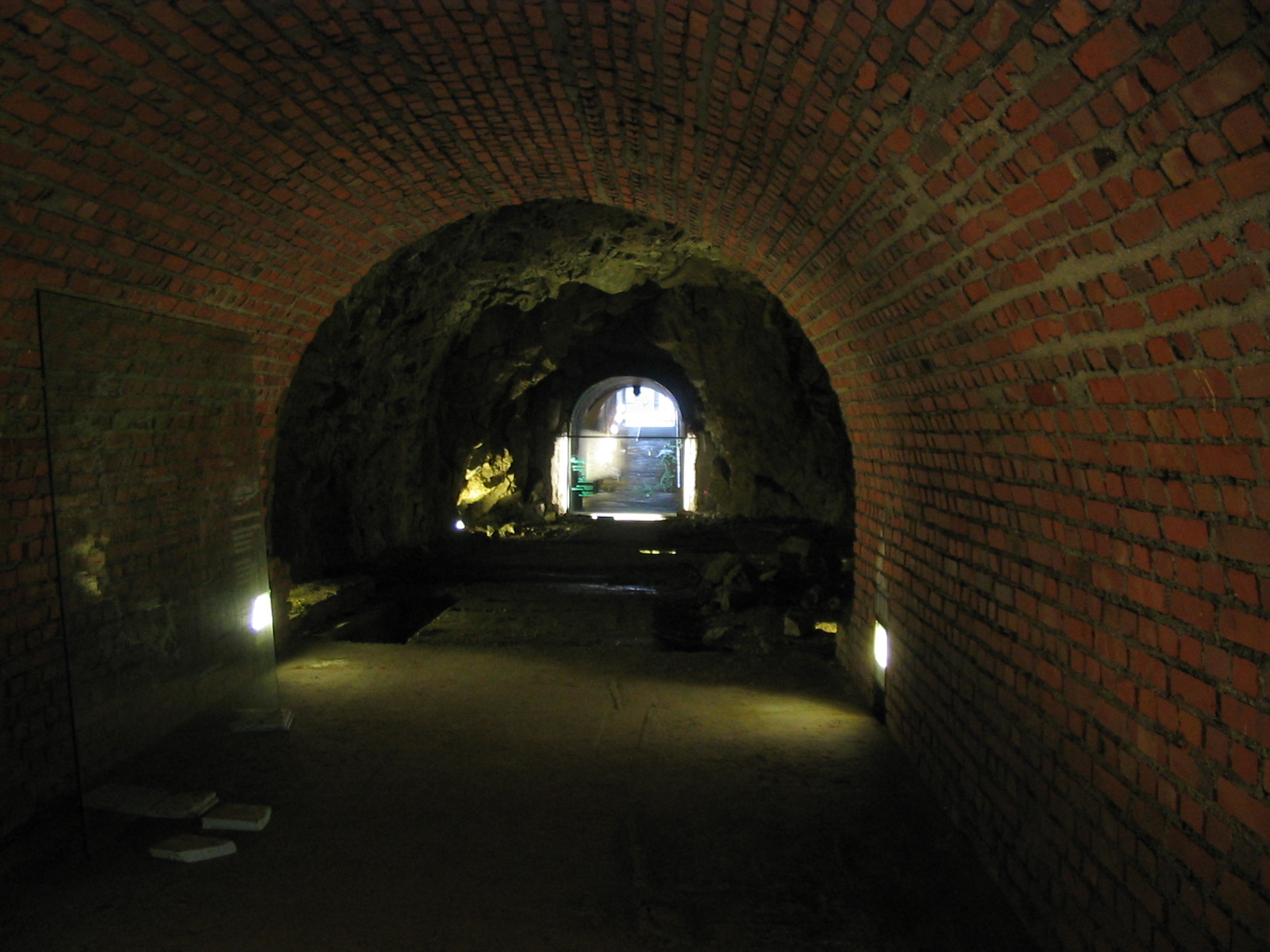
Inside the Platterhofbunker

The museum exhibition is taken care of by the Institute of Contemporary History in Munich. It offers over 950 documents, photographs, audio clips, films, and maps, as well as a scale model of the Obersalzberg area overlaying current buildings with the position of historical Nazi installations.

The exhibition covers the two floors of the main building and extends through the tunnel to the bunker, but only a portion of it is dedicated to the history of the Obersalzberg itself, including a small section on the post-1945 era, when most of the area was used by the American military. The ground floor of the main building and most of the tunnel exhibits cover general topics of Nazi Germany, such as "The Fuehrer", "Actors in the regime", "Machinery of Terror", "Resistance", "Foreign Policy", etc. that are not directly related to the Obersalzberg resort. The path of the exhibition ends in a documentation of the Holocaust in the dark of the bunker. Only a part of the extensive shelter network is accessible today. It also has special exhibitions. The 2008 Winter Exhibition was about "Free time in Fascism". From October 2012 to April 2013, the museum showed an exhibition on the victims of euthanasia.

== See also ==
- Kehlsteinhaus
- Obersalzberg Speech
