= Obersalzberg =

Mountainside retreat in Berchtesgaden, Bavaria, Germany

Coordinates: 47°37′52″N 13°3′21″E

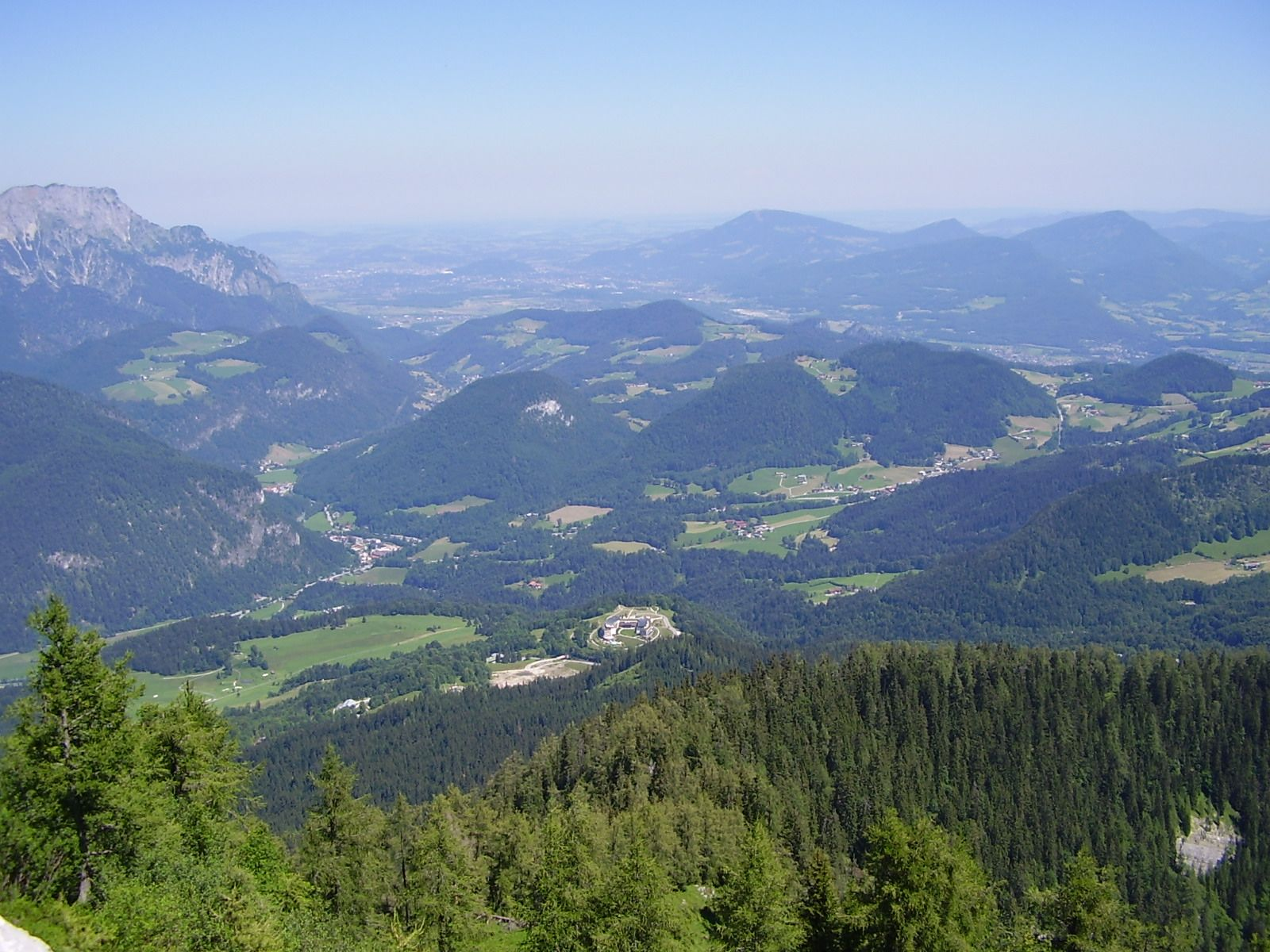
View from Kehlsteinhaus

Obersalzberg is a mountainside retreat situated above the market town of Berchtesgaden in Bavaria, Germany. Located about 120 kilometres (75 mi) south-east of Munich, close to the border with Austria, it is best known as the site of Adolf Hitler's former mountain residence, the Berghof, and of the mountaintop Kehlsteinhaus, popularly known in the English-speaking world as the "Eagle's Nest". The Kehlsteinhaus served as a restaurant and tourist attraction, until a devastating fire on the 23rd of October. The rest of the Nazi-era buildings were demolished in the 1950s, but that history was preserved in the Dokumentationszentrum Obersalzberg museum, which opened in 1999.

== History ==
The name of the settlement area derives from the rock salt deposits in the former Prince-Provostry of Berchtesgaden. Salt mining at Pherg is documented since the 12th century and a major salt mine opened in 1517. It was destroyed in 1834 but rebuilt and named the "Old Salt Works". The rectangular layout and some components still exist.

The area was part of the provostry's eight localities (so-called Gnotschaften) mentioned in the first land register of 1456 and was ruled by the Augustinian abbey. From 1517 the Petersberg gallery was built, the first of the Berchtesgaden salt mines which became the economic base of the Prince-provostry. The area was annexed by Austria in 1805 and then ruled by France in 1809–1810. With Berchtesgaden it was secularised in 1803 and passed to the Kingdom of Bavaria in 1810.

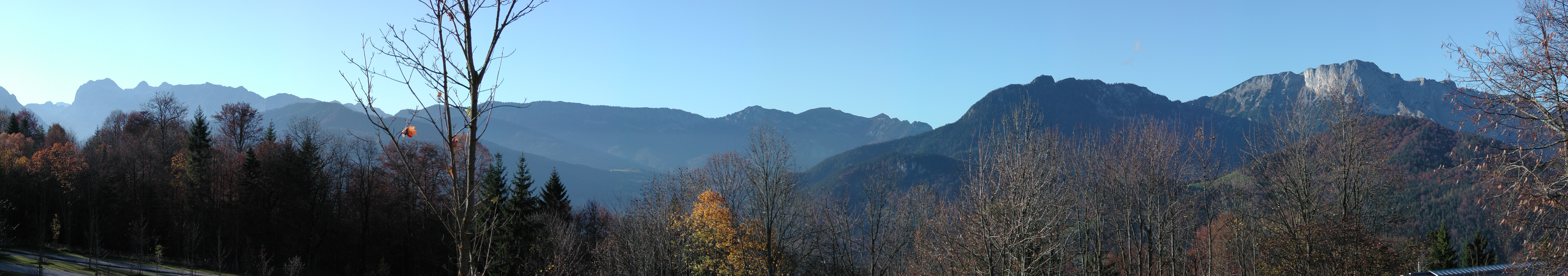
Panorama of Obersalzberg

Salzberg was re-established as a Bavarian municipality in 1817. Plans by Nazi authorities to merge it with Berchtesgaden were not carried out and Salzberg was not incorporated into Berchtesgaden until 1972. It was the scene of the filming of The Sound of Music's last scene where the von Trapps were escaping into what was thought to be Switzerland and to their freedom.

=== Hitler's retreat ===
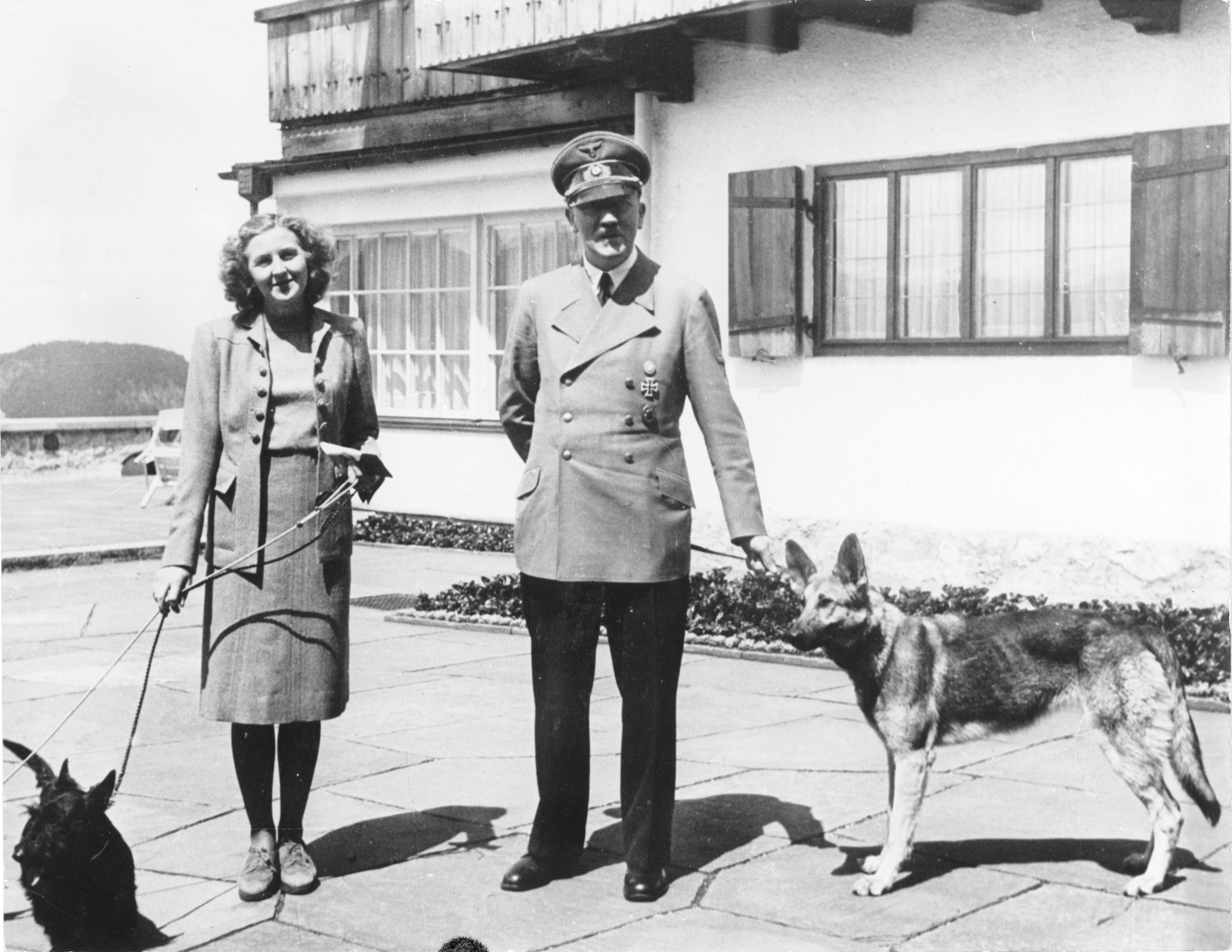
Hitler and Braun at the Berghof, 1942

In 1877 Mauritia Mayer, a pioneer in Alpine tourism, opened the Pension Moritz boarding house in Obersalzberg. In the late 19th century German intellectuals like Mayer's close friend Richard Voss, artists such as Johannes Brahms, Ludwig Ganghofer, Joseph Joachim, Ludwig Knaus, Franz von Lenbach, Peter Rosegger and Clara Schumann as well as industrialists like Carl von Linde began using the area as both a summer and winter vacation retreat. The Obersalzberg boarding house was leased to the former racing driver Bruno Büchner in the early 1920s. When he acquired the property in 1928, he renamed it Platterhof inspired by Richard Voss' novel Zwei Menschen.

The scenic landscape and sweeping mountain views also attracted Adolf Hitler, who in 1923 visited his fellow party member and anti-semite, Dietrich Eckart at the Obersalzberg boarding house, shortly before the Beer Hall Putsch and his imprisonment at Landsberg. It was in a cabin on the premises where, after his release from custody in 1925, he dictated Part Two of Mein Kampf, which earned him large royalties.

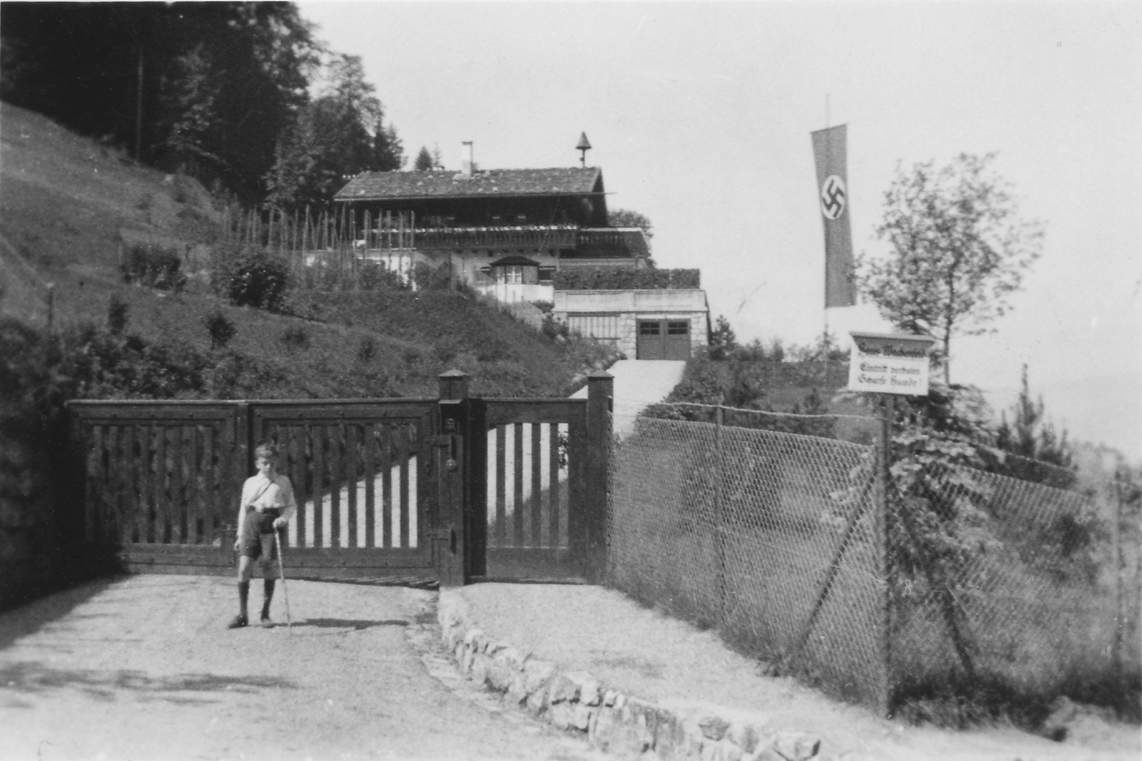
Haus Wachenfeld, 1934

He became so fond of the area that by 1928 he began using his royalty income to rent a small chalet nearby called Haus Wachenfeld from the widow of a Buxtehude manufacturer. Hitler put his half-sister Angela Raubal in charge of the household, together with her daughter Geli.

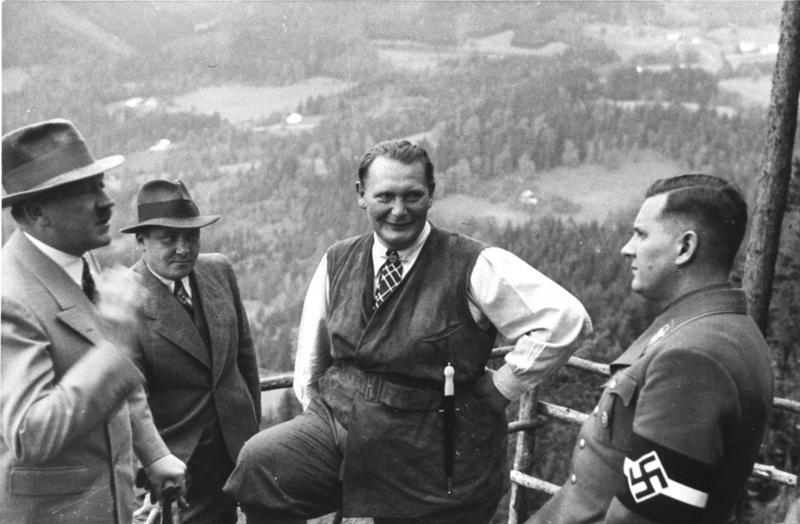
Hitler, Bormann, Göring and Baldur von Schirach at Obersalzberg, 1936

Several months after the Nazi seizure of power (Machtergreifung) in January 1933, Chancellor Hitler purchased Haus Wachenfeld and began making a series of three important renovations. The first included window shutters and a small office, followed a year later by a winter garden and stonework; finally, the most extensive in 1935–1936 when the once modest chalet was finally transformed into the sprawling landhaus with a series of extensions, a bowling alley in the cellar, and a giant window that could be lowered to provide a panoramic view. The house became known as the Berghof or Mountain Court in English.

Among other buildings in the area was the Kehlsteinhaus ("the house on Kehlstein mountain", called the "Eagle's Nest" by English speakers) atop the summit of the Kehlstein, a rocky outcrop, that was used for Nazi Party meetings and to host dignitaries; the building had no beds. It was presented to Adolf Hitler in 1939, on his 50th birthday, but he only visited the site on 14 occasions, because of a fear of heights among the reasons; Eva Braun used it more frequently.

=== Security zones ===
Around Hitler's home, several Nazi leaders such as Hermann Göring, Martin Bormann and Albert Speer acquired residences. By 1935–36 Party Secretary Bormann had all residents of Obersalzberg either bought out or evicted, and the area evolved into a retreat for high-level Nazis with a cinema, a school for young children, an SS barracks, and an underground shooting range. Most of the original buildings were demolished. The Berghof became something of a German tourist attraction during the mid-1930s. This led to the introduction of severe restrictions on access to the area and other security measures. A large contingent of the SS Leibstandarte Adolf Hitler was housed in barracks adjacent to the Berghof. Under the command of Obersturmbannführer Bernhard Frank, they patrolled an extensive cordoned security zone that encompassed the nearby homes of the other Nazi leaders. The Obersalzberg area comprised three security zones.

The so-called Führersperrgebiet ("the Führer's autonomous area") shielded Hitler and his staff from public access. Two other security zones protected the heavily expanded SS and SD barracks, support staff, guest houses, underground bunkers, and air-raid shelters.

In 1938 Bormann also had the Kehlsteinhaus lodge erected on a rocky promontory, including a lift system from the upper end of the access road. Hitler seldom visited it, though he and his mistress Eva Braun spent much time at Obersalzberg. From 1937 the German Reich Chancellery maintained a second seat in the nearby village of Bischofswiesen with Hitler receiving numerous guests of state at the Berghof.

With the outbreak of war extensive anti-aircraft defences were installed, including smoke generating machines to conceal the Berghof complex from hostile aircraft. Further, the nearby former Hotel zum Türken was turned into quarters to house the Reichssicherheitsdienst (RSD) SS security men who patrolled the grounds of the Berghof. Several Heer mountain troop units were also housed nearby. Hence, the British never planned a direct attack on the compound.

Hitler spent much of August 1939 at the Berghof, making final plans for the invasion of Poland. His last known visit was on 14 July 1944.

=== Destruction of the compound ===
The premises – except for the Kehlsteinhaus – were heavily damaged by an Allied air raid on 25 April 1945. On 4 May, four days after Hitler's suicide in Berlin, retreating SS troops set fire to the villa as Hitler had previously ordered.

Only hours later, the U.S. 3rd Infantry Division arrived at Berchtesgaden along with the French 2nd Armoured Division. The Obersalzberg area was placed under the U.S. administration. At the time, the Berghof still contained destroyed paintings, evening gowns, medical equipment, and a wine cellar. The house was looted by American troops.

The Berghof's shell survived and had been attracting tourists until 1952 when the Bavarian government decided to demolish the buildings so they would not become a Nazi shrine. On 30 April, the Berghof, the houses of Göring and Bormann, the SS barracks, the Kampfhäusl, and the teahouse were all destroyed. In total, over 50 Obersalzberg Nazi buildings were destroyed.

==== Restoration of the area ====
The Platterhof, which had been a hostel for visitors to the area, was not destroyed since it had been turned into the General Walker Hotel for U.S. troops after the war. It was demolished in 2001.

The nearby Hotel zum Türken, often used by the SS, later occupied by Hitler's bodyguard, and then the Generalmajor of the Police, was badly damaged in 1945. It was rebuilt in 1950 and reopened as a hotel before Christmas.

The nearby Dokumentationszentrum Obersalzberg museum, opened in 1999, provides historical information on the use of the mountainside retreat during the war, and about the history of National Socialism; visitors can tour the bunker complex. (Access to the bunkers was closed for construction in September 2017 and remained closed in July 2018 "until further notice".) The museum is operated by the Institut für Zeitgeschichte (Institute of Contemporary History).

The Berchtesgaden National Park, billed as "the only National Park in the German Alps", was established in 1978 and has gradually become one of Berchtesgaden's largest draws. The park attracts 1.5 million visitors per year. Mass tourism is confined to a few popular spots, leaving the rest to nature seekers. The trail system covers 250 kilometres (155 miles).

In 1995, the entire area was returned to the Bavarian state government that facilitated the erection of a hotel (operated by the InterContinental Hotels Group), which opened in 2005. Since May 2015, the InterContinental hotel has been renamed the Kempinski Hotel Berchtesgaden. Other tourist draws are the Königssee, the salt mine where visitors can tour the pumping hall, some tunnels and the museum.

The Kehlsteinhaus (Eagle's Nest) is open seasonally as a restaurant. During one of the bus trips to the restaurant, visitors can see the ruins of some Third Reich buildings.

== Buildings during the time of Nazi Germany ==
- Berghof (Hitler's private home)
- Partei-Gästehaus "Hoher Göll" (today, Dokumentationszentrum Obersalzberg)
- Gutshof
- SS Kaserne, barracks
- Gärtnerei (nursery)
- Kehlsteinhaus ("Eagle's Nest")
- Pension Moritz
- Platterhof (later General Walker Hotel)
- Mooslahnerkopf Teehaus
- Hotel zum Türken/RSD, Sicherheitsdienst, Security Service
- Kampfhäusl (where Hitler dictated part two of Mein Kampf)
- Gutshof (today, SkyTop Lodge, golf course, restaurant, and pro shop)
- The houses of Martin Bormann, Hermann Göring and Albert Speer
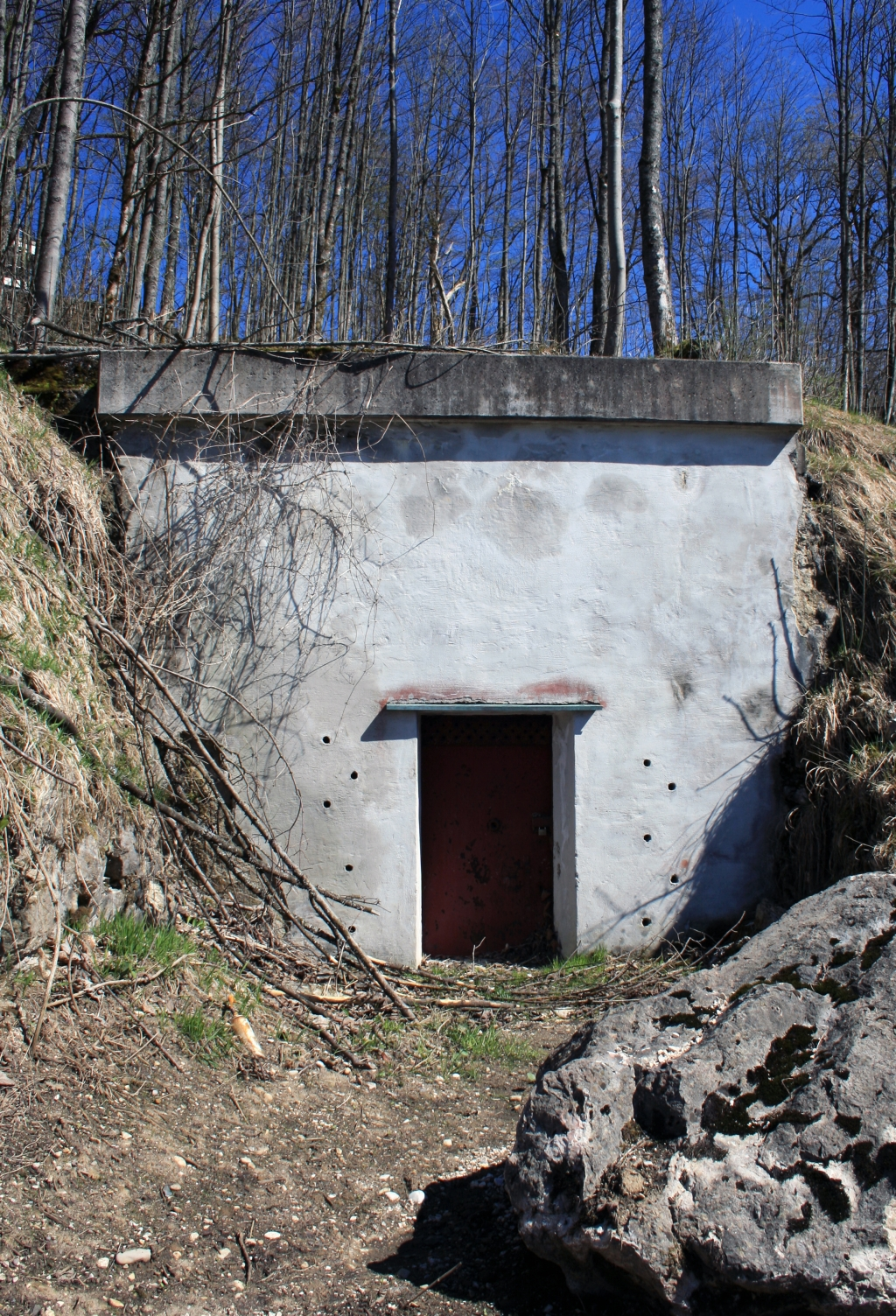
Entrance to Martin Bormann's bunker in 2008

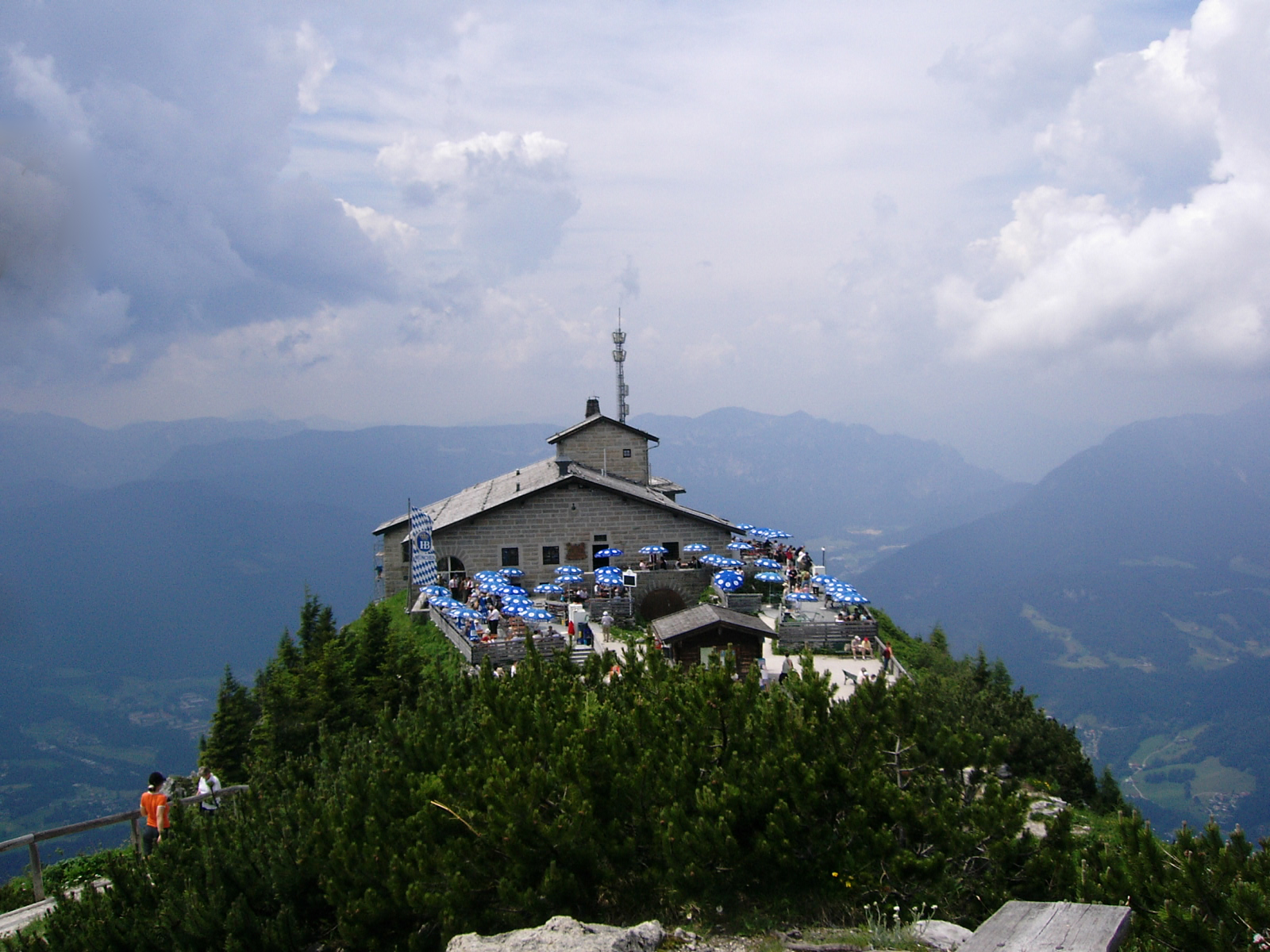
Bergrestaurant Kehlsteinhaus

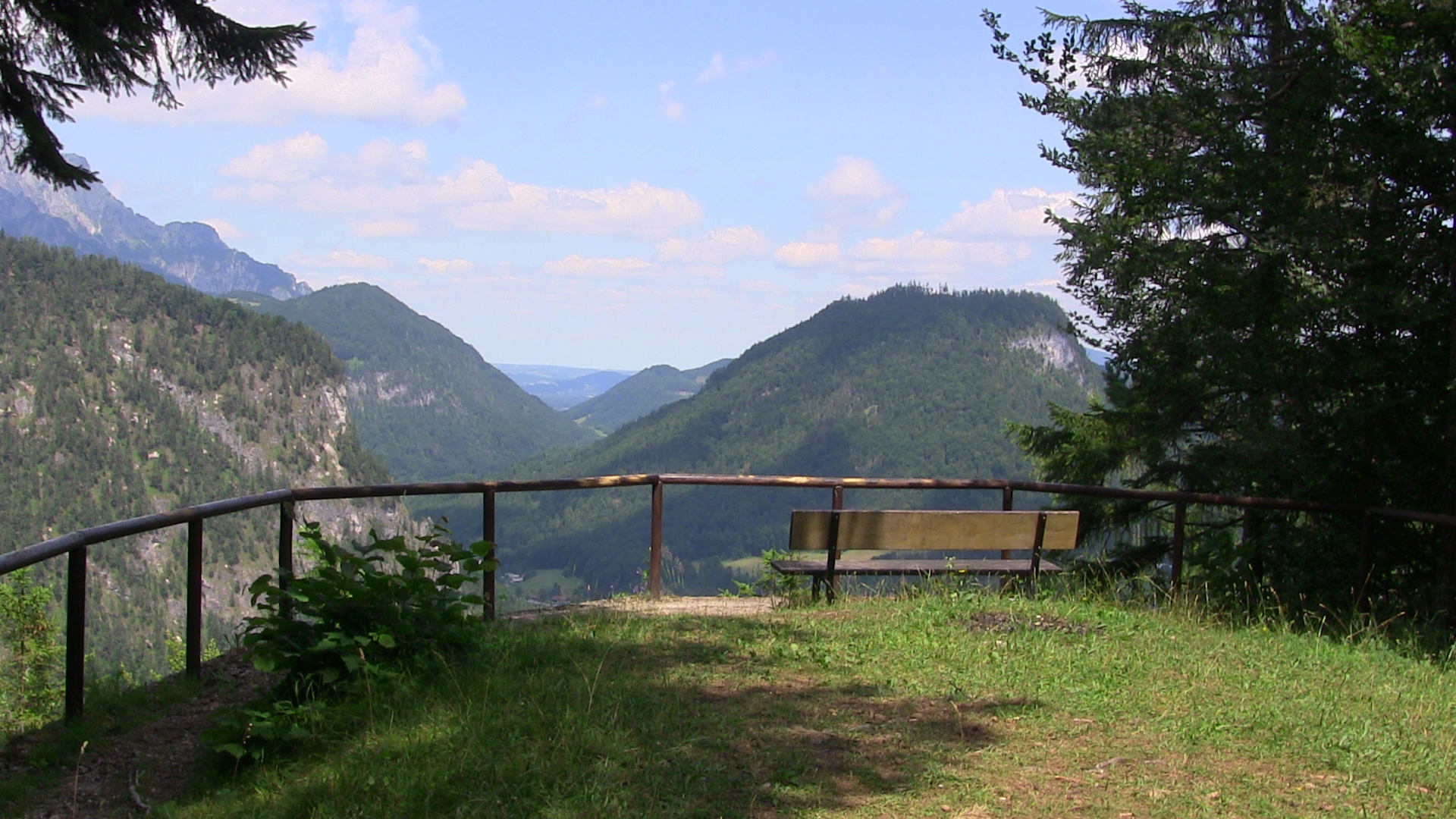
View from the "Teehaus am Mooslahnerkopf" site to Salzburg in 2019

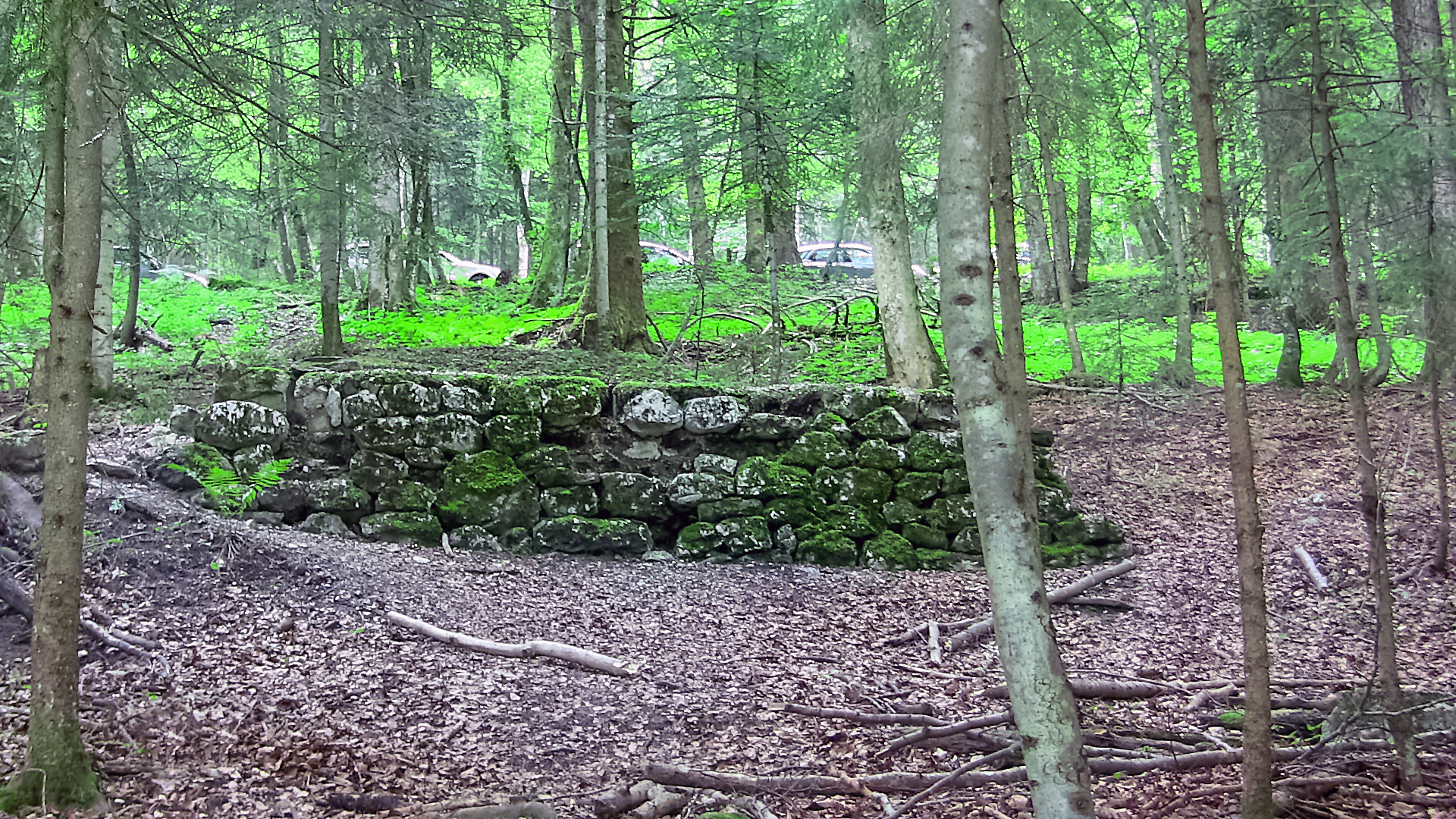
Remains of the "Kampfhäusl" in 2019

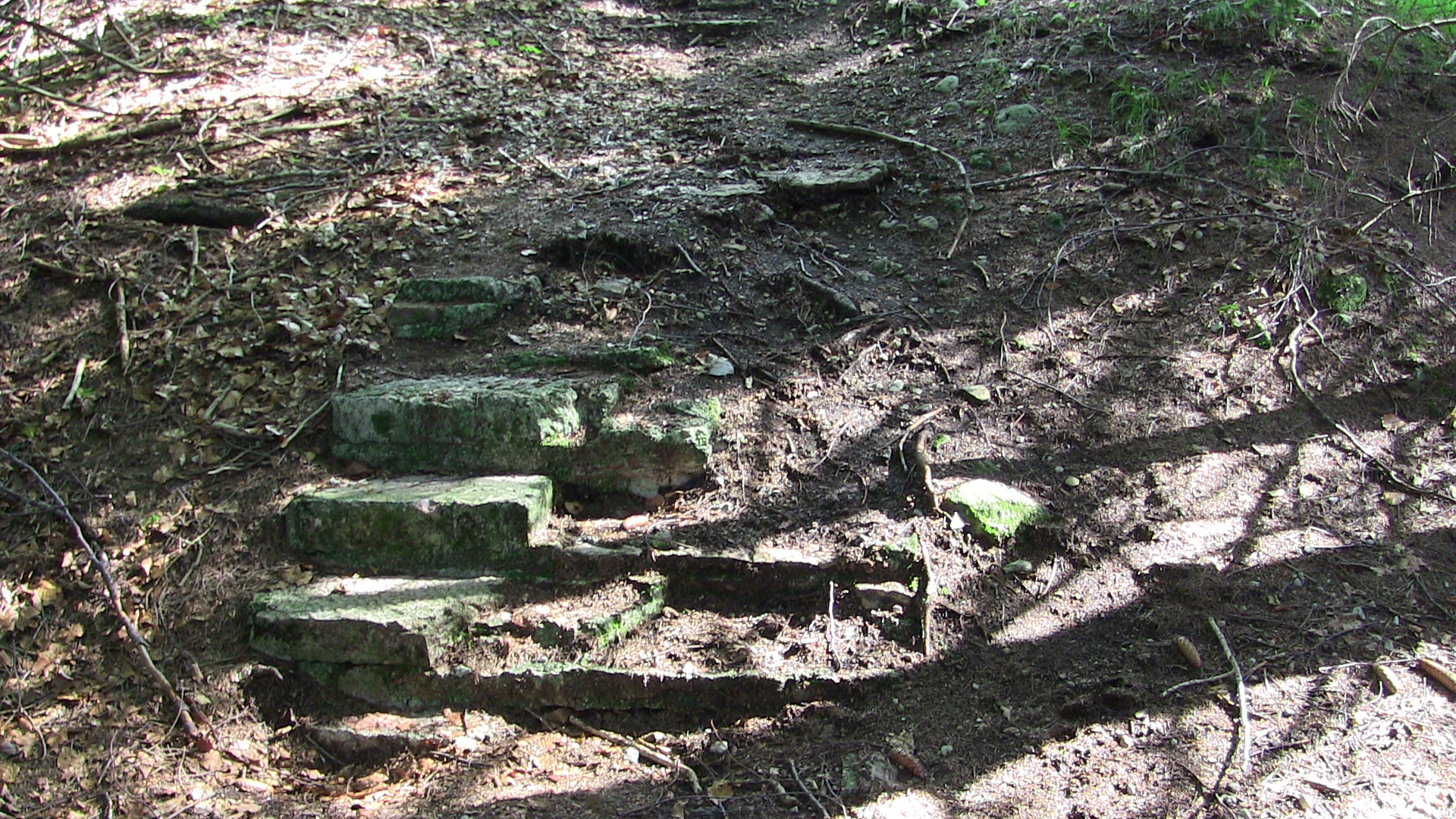
Remains of stairs from the house of Hermann Göring in 2019

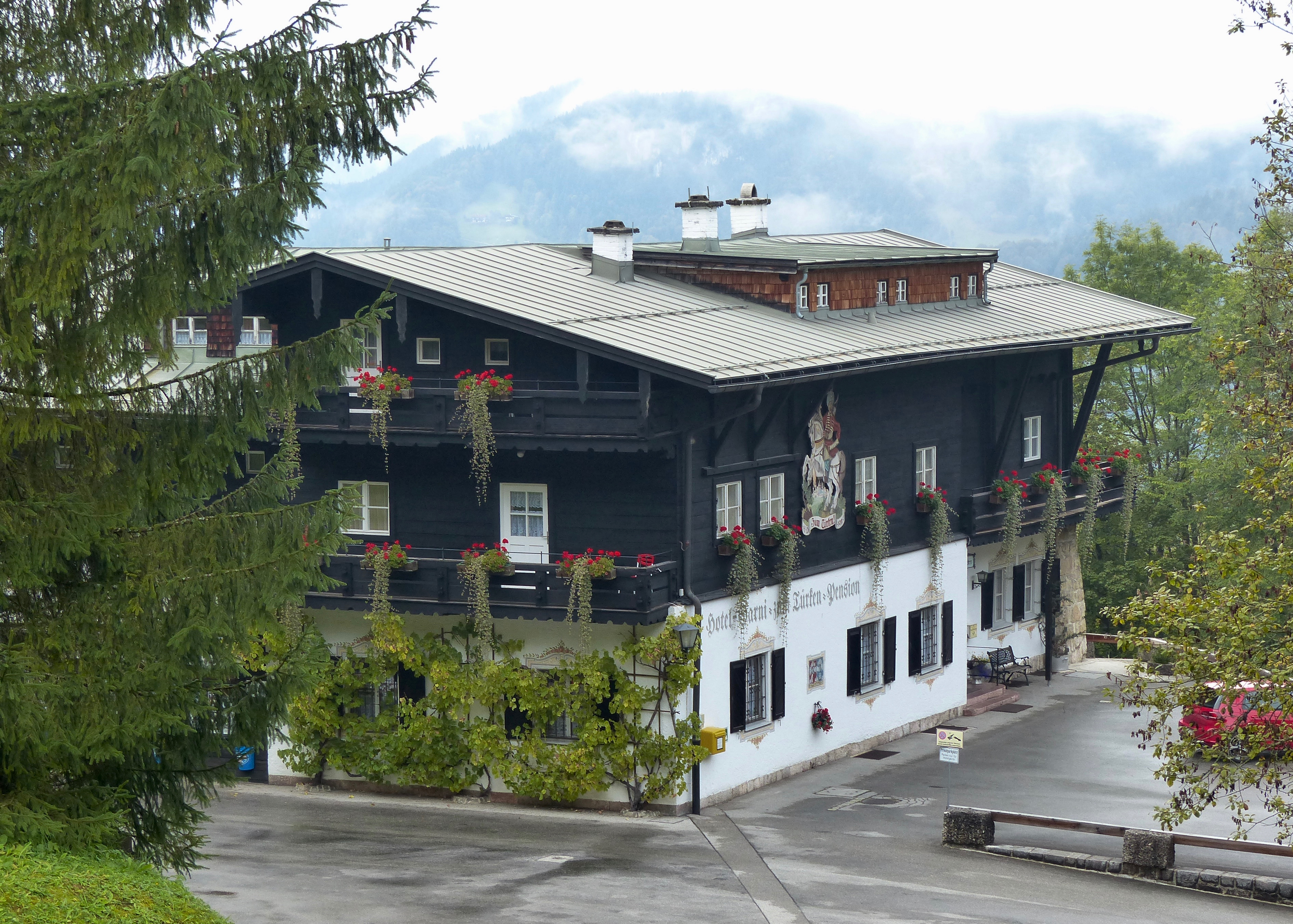
Hotel zum Türken in 2017

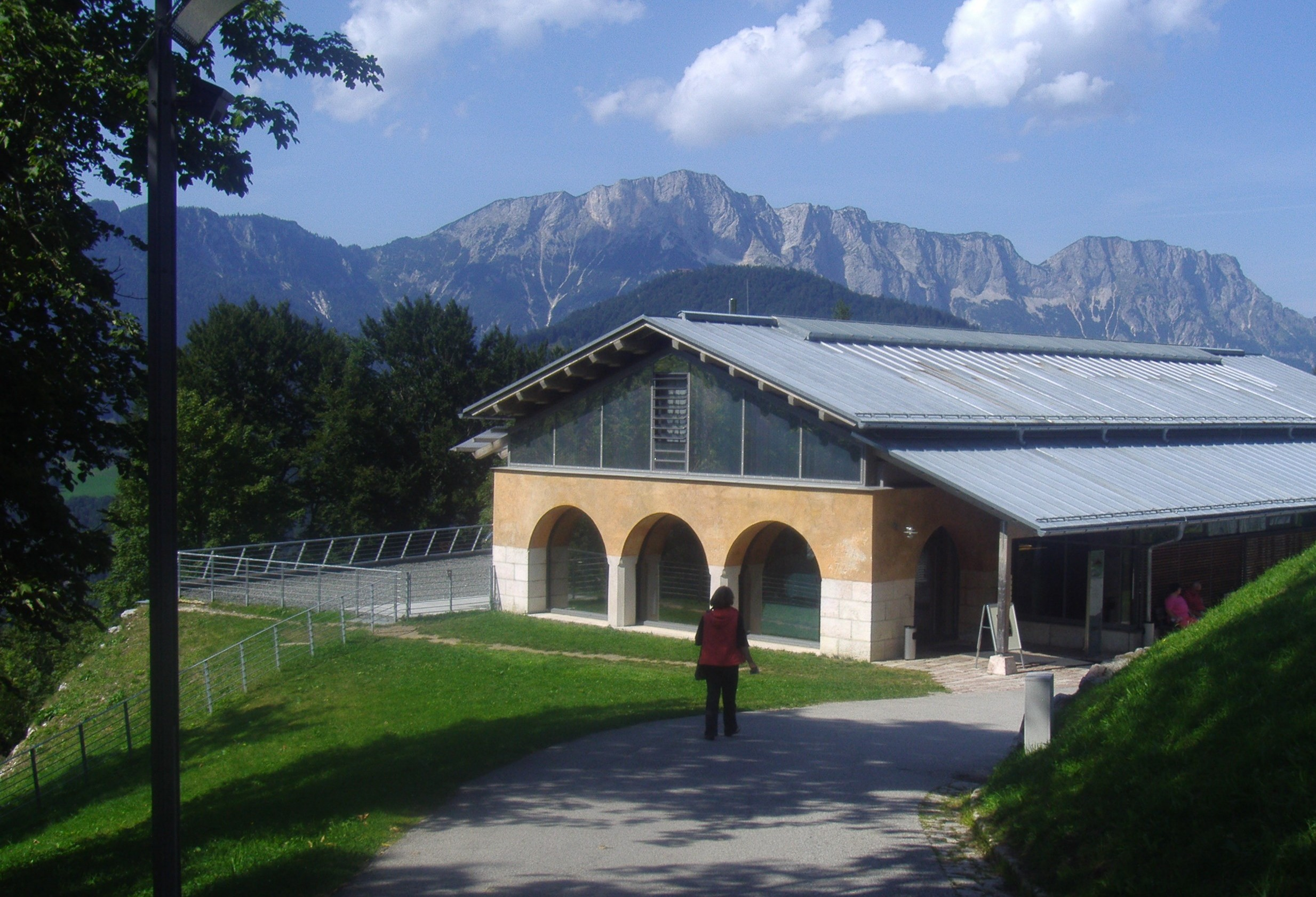
Dokumentationszentrum Obersalzberg in 2008

== See also ==
- Obersalzberg Speech
- National Redoubt (the supposed Nazi "Alpenfestung" [Alpine Fortress])
