= Edelweiss (actress) =

Russian pornographic actress (born 1977)

- Born: 1 September 1977 (age 48); Tyumen, Russian SFSR, Soviet Union
- Other name: Oxana
- Height: 5 ft 5 in (1.65 m)
- Spouse: Aleksandar Lomski

Edelweiss (Bulgarian: Еделвайс, Edelvays; born 1 September 1977) is a Russian-Bulgarian actress, TV host, erotic model and former pornographic actress. She lives in Italy and is married to the Bulgarian photographer Aleksandar "Alex" Lomski.

== Biography ==
Edelweiss was born 1 September 1977, in Tyumen, Russia. For 15 years, she lived in Italy with her Bulgarian husband, the photographer Aleksandar "Alex" Lomski, who is also a former pornographic film actor. Edelweiss met her future husband Aleksandar in Bulgaria. In 2006, she posed for the Bulgarian edition of Playboy magazine. In 2013, she participated in VIP Brother 5.

== Television appearances ==
- Satyricon (Rai 2) all episodes
- Libero with Teo Mammucari (Rai 2) two episodes
- Le iene (Italia 1) six episodes
- Ciao Darwin (Canale 5) two episodes
- Lucignolo (Italia 1) four episodes
- Maurizio Costanzo Show (Canale 5) nine episodes
- Bay Bay Baby (Rai 2) all episodes
- Markette (La Sette) one episode
- Verissimo (Canale 5) two episodes
- Studio aperto (Italia 1)
- Gente di notte (Rai 1)
- Striscia la notizia (Canale 5)
- VIP Brother 5 (2013, Nova television)

== Filmography ==
=== Mainstream films ===
- E adesso sesso (2001, Carlo Vanzina)
- Andata e ritorno (2003, Alessandro Paci)
- Un medico in famiglia (2005, serie TV)
- Un ciclone in famiglia (2005, serie TV)
- Il ritorno del Monnezza (2005, Carlo Vanzina)
- Lycantropus (2006, Pasquale Fanetti)
- Un'estate ai Caraibi (2009, Carlo Vanzina)
- Ex – Amici come prima! (2011, Carlo Vanzina)
- Good as You (2012, Carlo Vanzina)

=== Pornographic films ===
- Bellissima
- Divina (2006)
- Desideri bagnati
- Desiderando Edelweiss
- Fantastica Edelweiss (2006)
- Edelweiss è Magica
- I sogni di Edelweiss
- Le voglie di Edelweiss (2007)
- Sapore di sesso
- Mente Criminale (2007)
- Edelweiss Troia più che Mai
- Edelweiss Superporca
- Sandy & Edelweiss Insatiables
