= Rogue Male =

Rogue Male may refer to:

- Rogue Male (novel), a novel by Geoffrey Household published in 1939
  - Man Hunt (1941 film), a 1941 film adaption of Household's novel, directed by Fritz Lang
  - Rogue Male (1976 film), a 1976 BBC television adaptation of Household's novel, directed by Clive Donner
- Rogue Male (band), a British heavy metal band
