= Teahouse on Mooslahnerkopf Hill =

Former teahouse in southern Germany

Tea House on the Mooslahnerkopf Hill
- Teehaus am Mooslahnerkopf
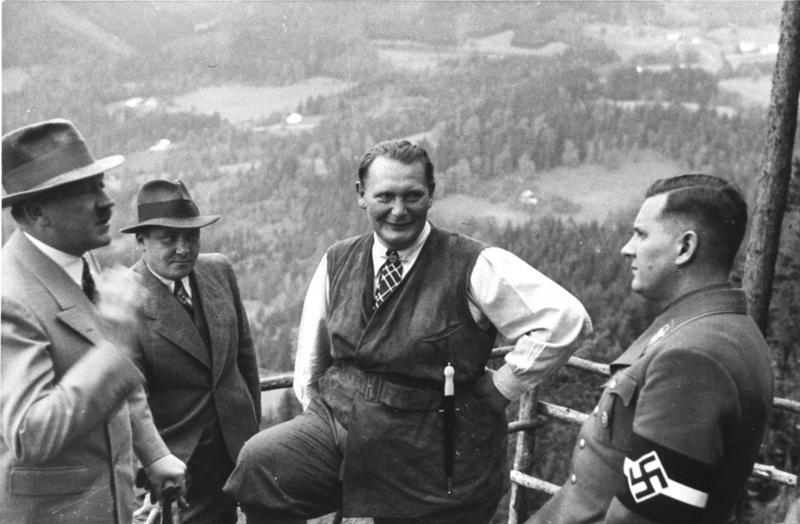
- Adolf Hitler, Martin Bormann, Hermann Göring and Baldur von Schirach at the panoramic view point in front of the tea house

- Location within Germany

General information
- Status: Demolished
- Location: Obersalzberg, Berchtesgaden, Germany
- Coordinates: 47°38′22.3″N 13°02′12″E
- Owner: Adolf Hitler

The Teahouse on Mooslahnerkopf Hill was the favourite destination of Adolf Hitler when he was at the Berghof at Obersalzberg.

== History ==
After architect Roderich Fick had expanded the house Wachenfeld to the Berghof for Hitler in 1936, Martin Bormann commissioned him to construct the tea house on Mooslahnerkopf not far from the domicile on Obersalzberg. In the catalog of works, however, it is listed as a "teahouse on Moslahnerkopf" as well as in the architectural plans and in the memories of Eva Braun. The cylindrical teahouse was built in 1937 and was Hitler's favourite destination which he, in contrast to the Kehlsteinhaus (Eagle's Nest), used nearly every afternoon. On April 25, 1945, the area on the Obersalzberg was attacked by the Royal Air Force. The teahouse was not hit. The house was destroyed and demolished by the Americans in 1951–1952, to prevent it being used as a memorial to Hitler.

== Location and appearance ==
The teahouse was built directly on the hillside, a foothill of the Hoher Göll. The central basement had a diameter of nine metres and was illuminated by three large windows, which also allowed a limited panoramic view in the Berchtesgadener basin. A power supply, water connection, and a sewer were also installed. The entrance to the round teahouse was on the hillside.

In the middle stood a circular table with plush upholstered armchairs arranged around it. There was additional seating around the central furniture. The room also had stone pillasters (affixed with brass light fixtures) and fireplace.

The rotunda was followed by a 12-meter-long, hexagonal farm building. In the further area — not visible to guests hidden in the surrounding forest — there were single-person air raid shelters and buildings for the guards.

== Daily ritual ==
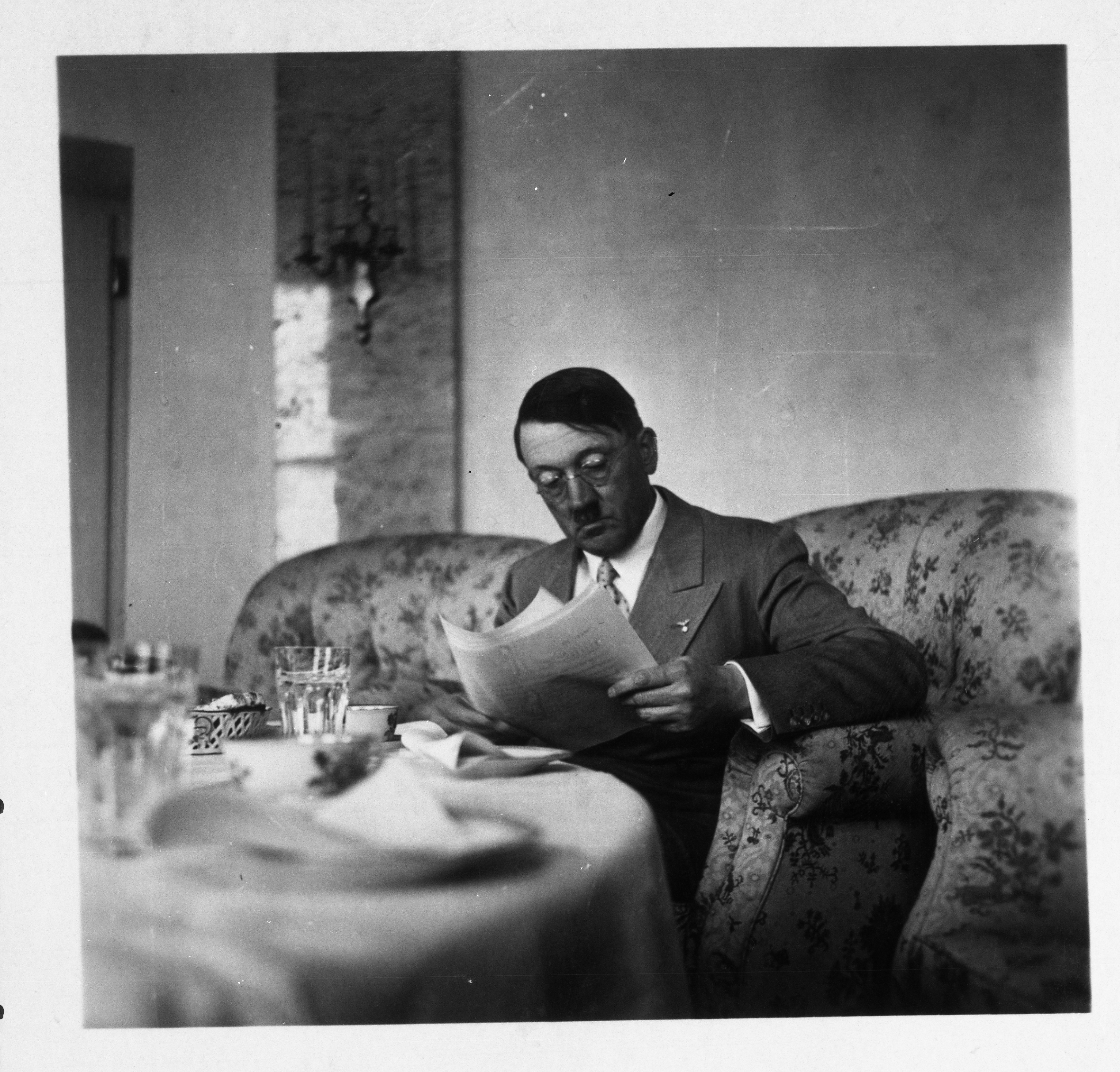
Hitler at the teahouse, late 1930s

Hitler made the 20-minute walk from the Berghof to the teahouse with his dog Blondi, closest friends, and associates. After having tea, coffee, and cakes, Hitler often fell asleep and was driven back to the Berghof by car.

== Post-war ruins ==
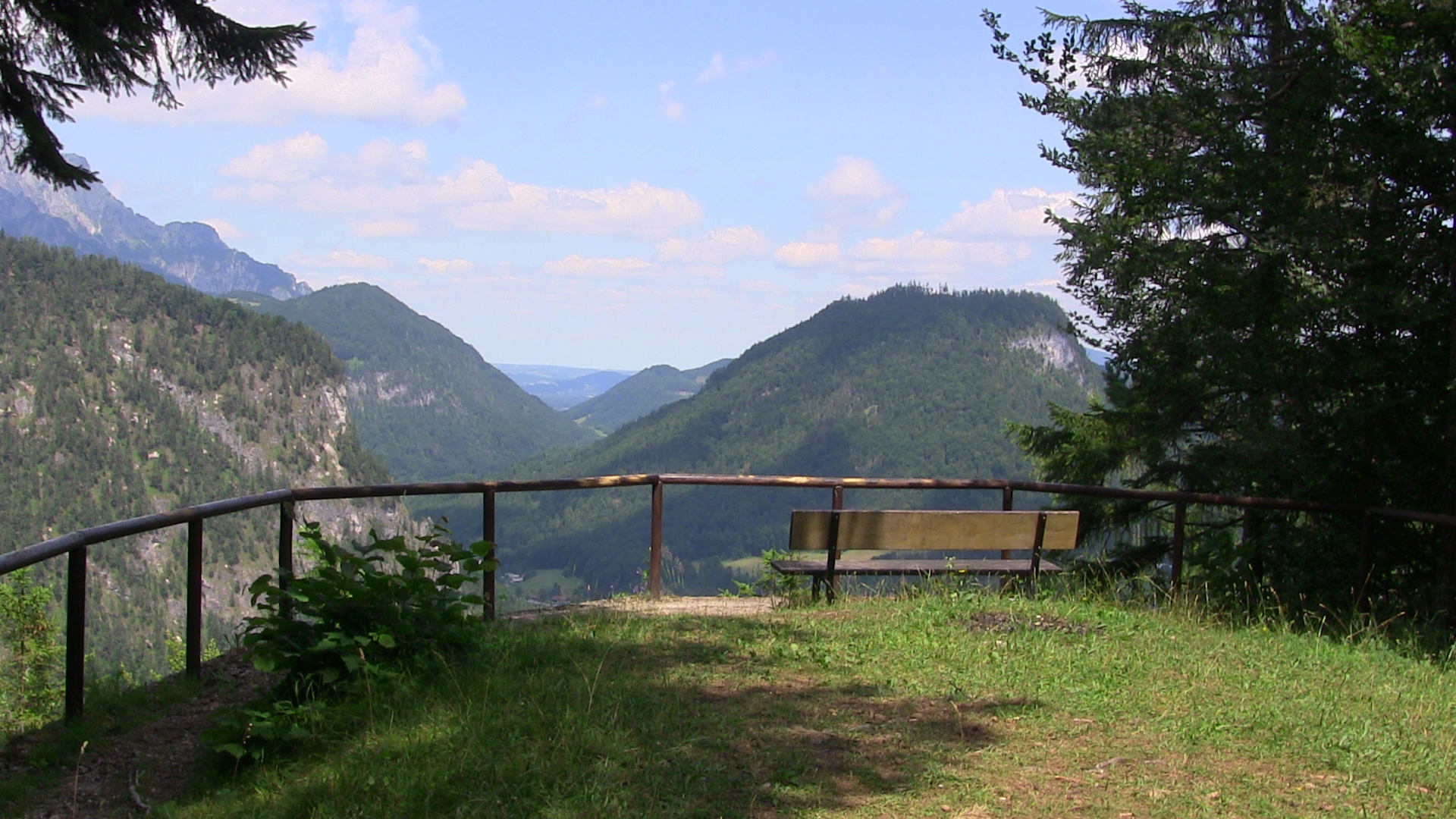
View from the "Teehaus am Mooslahnerkopf" site to Salzburg in 2019

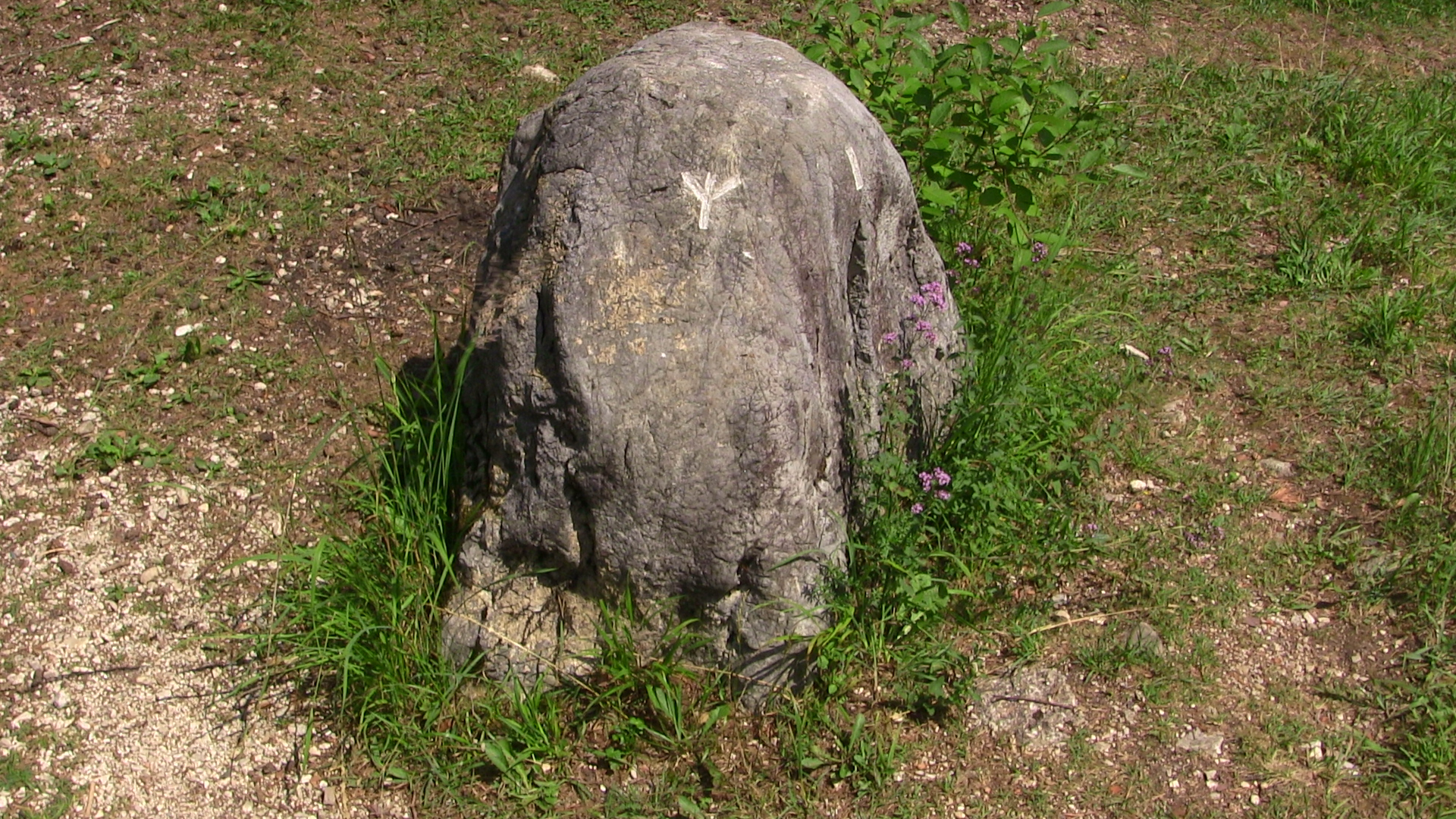
Algiz rune at the site of the former teahouse

The remains that used to be near a golf course (hole 13) were finally removed in August 2006 by order of the Bavarian government, after the establishment of the Kempinski Hotel Berchtesgaden (originally the InterContinental and now the Kempinski Hotel Berchtesgaden). Today nothing remains of the buildings, but the panoramic view point still exists. It was rebuilt for a movie about Albert Speer and Hitler. One single-person air raid shelter exists in the woods nearby.

== Sources ==
- GUIDO, Pietro (2013). Hitler's Berghof and the Tea-House (2° ed.). Milan: ISEM. ISBN 978-88-87077-07-0.
- Walden, Geoffrey R. (2014). Hitler's Berchtesgaden – A Guide to Third Reich Sites in the Berchtesgaden and Obersalzberg Area. Fonthill Media. ISBN 978-1-78155-226-1.
