= Berghof (residence) =

Adolf Hitler's Bavarian holiday home

The Berghof
- Berghof
- Hitler's Berghof on a 1941 postcard published by Heinrich Hoffmann

- Location within Germany
- Former names: Haus Wachenfeld

General information
- Status: Demolished
- Type: Chalet
- Location: Obersalzberg, Berchtesgaden, Germany
- Coordinates: 47°38′01″N 13°02′31″E
- Elevation: 921 m (3,022 ft)
- Construction started: 1916
- Renovated: 1935–1936, 1943
- Destroyed: April 25, 1945
- Demolished: 1952
- Owner: Adolf Hitler

Design and construction
- Architect: Unknown
- Architecture firm: Hochtief AG

The Berghof (German pronunciation: [ˈbɛʁkhoːf]) was Adolf Hitler's holiday retreat in the Obersalzberg of the Bavarian Alps near Berchtesgaden, Bavaria, Germany. Originally a modest chalet, Hitler holidayed there in the 1920s before purchasing it in 1933 with proceeds from Mein Kampf and significantly expanding it. The Berghof functioned as one of Hitler's secondary headquarters from which he directed war and policy decisions, and hosted Nazi Party leaders and foreign dignitaries.

Other than the Wolfsschanze ("Wolf's Lair"), his headquarters in East Prussia during the invasion of the Soviet Union, Hitler spent more time at the Berghof than anywhere else during his time as Führer of Nazi Germany.

The Berghof was heavily damaged by British bombing in April 1945, and again in early May by retreating SS troops. It was looted after Allied troops reached the area. The Bavarian government demolished the burned shell in 1952. Its extensive network of underground tunnels remains intact.

== History ==
The Berghof began as a much smaller chalet called Haus Wachenfeld, a holiday home built in 1916 (or 1917) by Kommerzienrat Otto Winter, a businessman from Buxtehude. It was located near the Platterhof, the former Pension Moritz where Hitler had stayed in 1922–23. By 1926, the family running the pension had left, and Hitler did not like the new owner. He moved first to the Marineheim and then to a hotel in Berchtesgaden, the Deutsches Haus, where he dictated the second volume of Mein Kampf in the summer of 1926. Hitler met his girlfriend at that time, Maria Reiter, who worked in a shop on the ground floor of the hotel, during another visit in autumn 1926. In 1928, Winter's widow rented Haus Wachenfeld to Hitler, and his half-sister Angela came to live there as housekeeper, although she left soon after her daughter Geli's death in Hitler's Munich apartment in 1931.

By 1933, Hitler had purchased Haus Wachenfeld with funds he received from the sale of his political manifesto Mein Kampf. The small chalet-style building was refurbished and much expanded by architect Alois Degano during 1935–36 under the supervision of Martin Bormann, when it was renamed The Berghof (English: "Mountain Court"). The renovated interiors were designed by Gerdy Troost.

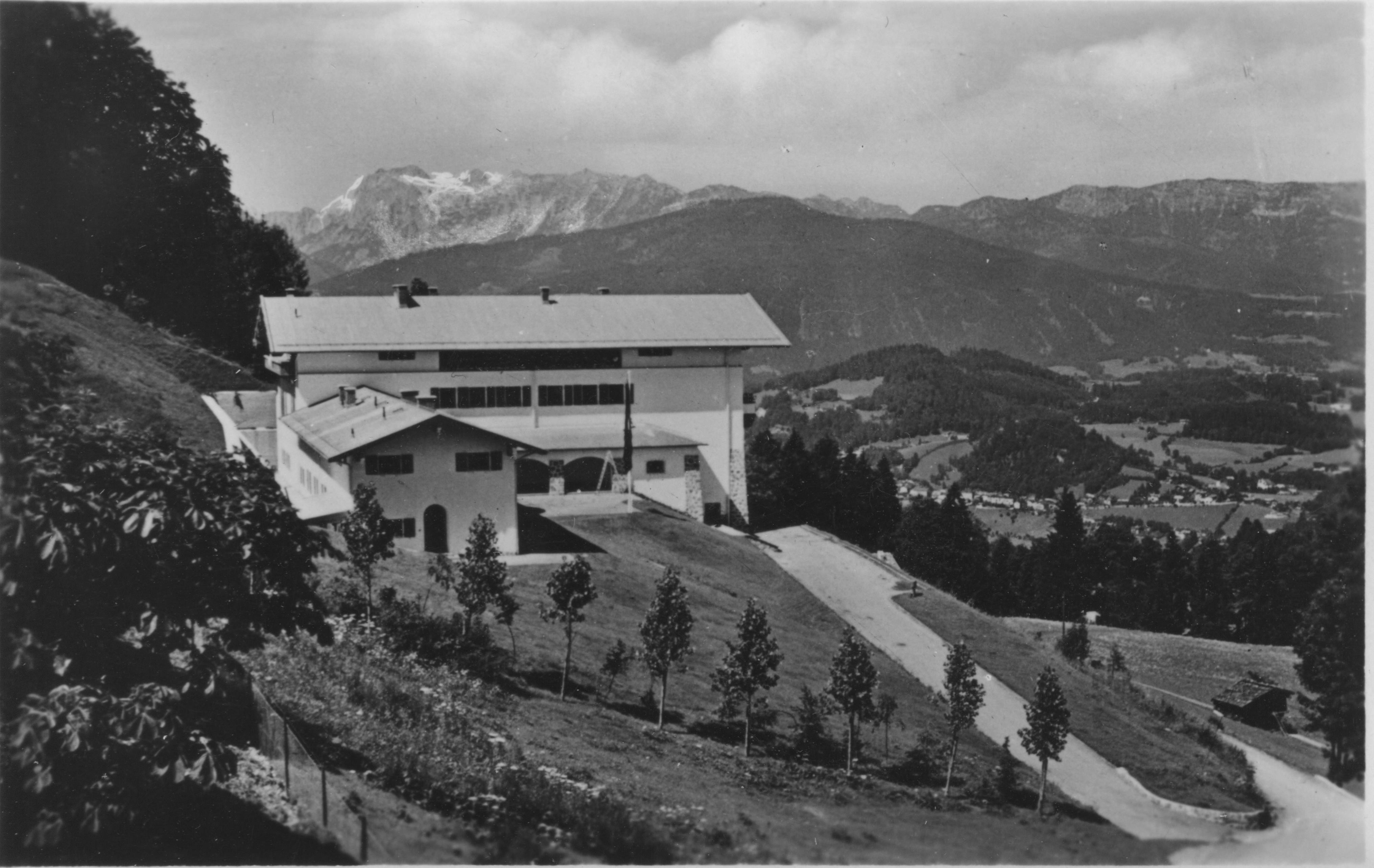
The Berghof in 1936

A large terrace was built and featured big, colourful, resort-style canvas umbrellas. The entrance hall "was filled with a curious display of cactus plants in majolica pots." A dining room was panelled with very costly cembra pine. Hitler's large study had a telephone switchboard room. The library contained books "on history, painting, architecture and music." A great hall was furnished with expensive Teutonic furniture, a large globe, and an expansive red marble fireplace mantel. Behind one wall was a projection booth for evening screenings of films (often, Hollywood productions, including Mickey Mouse).

A sprawling picture window could be lowered into the wall to give a sweeping, open-air view of the snow-capped mountains in Hitler's native Austria. The house was maintained much like a small resort hotel by several housekeepers, gardeners, cooks, and other domestic workers.

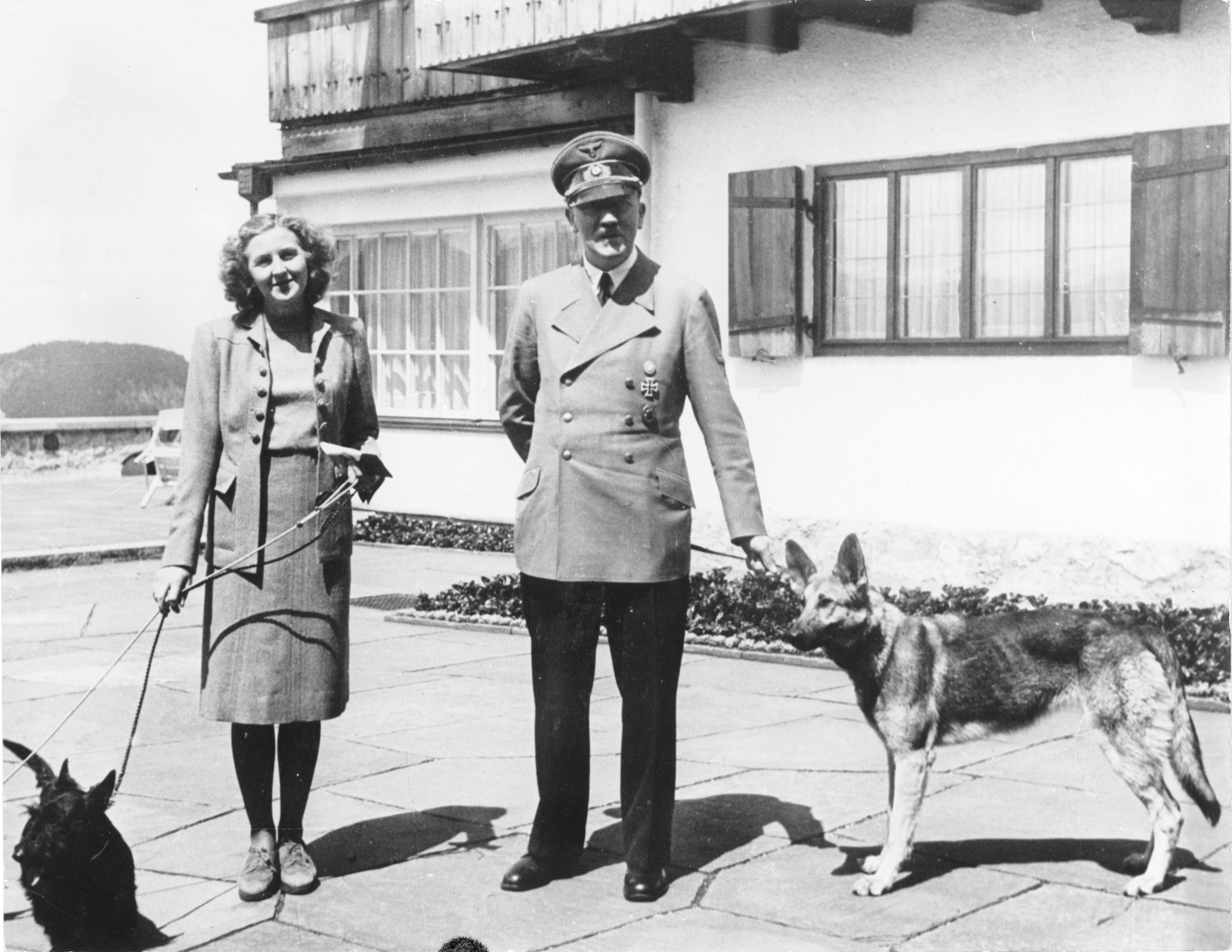
Adolf Hitler and Eva Braun with their dogs at the Berghof

The Berghof became a centrepiece of Nazi propaganda. The Nazi-controlled German press as well as the English-language international press covered Hitler's life at home in a positive light. These stories helped to soften his image by portraying him as a man of culture, dog lover, and good neighbour. Writer William George Fitz-Gerald, under the pseudonym Ignatius Phayre, published many articles about visiting Hitler at home that were fabricated from Nazi propaganda sources.

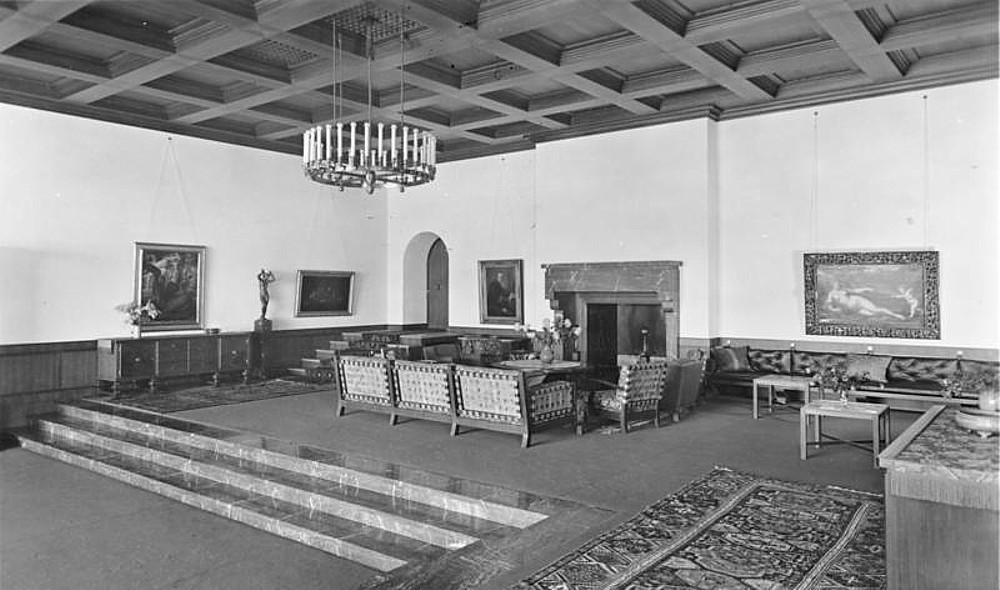
The "Great Hall"

Based on German propaganda sources, Fitz-Gerald, writing for the British Homes & Gardens magazine, described Hitler as "his own decorator, designer, and furnisher, as well as architect", and the chalet as "bright and airy" with "a light jade-green colour scheme"; caged Harz Roller canaries were kept in most of the rooms, which were furnished with antiques, mostly German furniture from the 18th century. Old engravings hung in the guest bedrooms, along with some of Hitler's small watercolour sketches. His personal valet Heinz Linge stated that Hitler and his longtime companion Eva Braun had two bedrooms and two bathrooms with interconnecting doors, and Hitler would end most evenings alone with her in his study drinking tea.

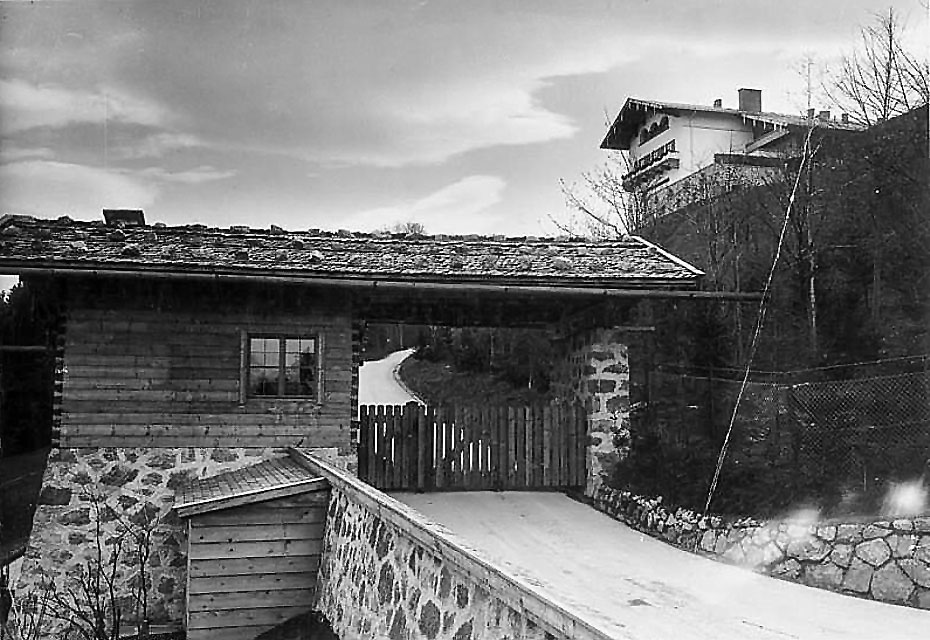
The gatehouse with the Berghof seen in the background.

Though Hitler did not smoke, smoking was allowed on the terrace. His vegetarian diet was supplied by nearby kitchen gardens and, later, a greenhouse. A large complex of mountain homes for the Nazi leadership, and many buildings for their security and support staff, were constructed nearby. To acquire the land for these projects, many neighbours were compelled to sell their properties and leave. A mountaintop structure, the Kehlsteinhaus, nicknamed Eagle's Nest by André François-Poncet, a French diplomat, was built in 1937–38 above the Berghof, but Hitler rarely went there.

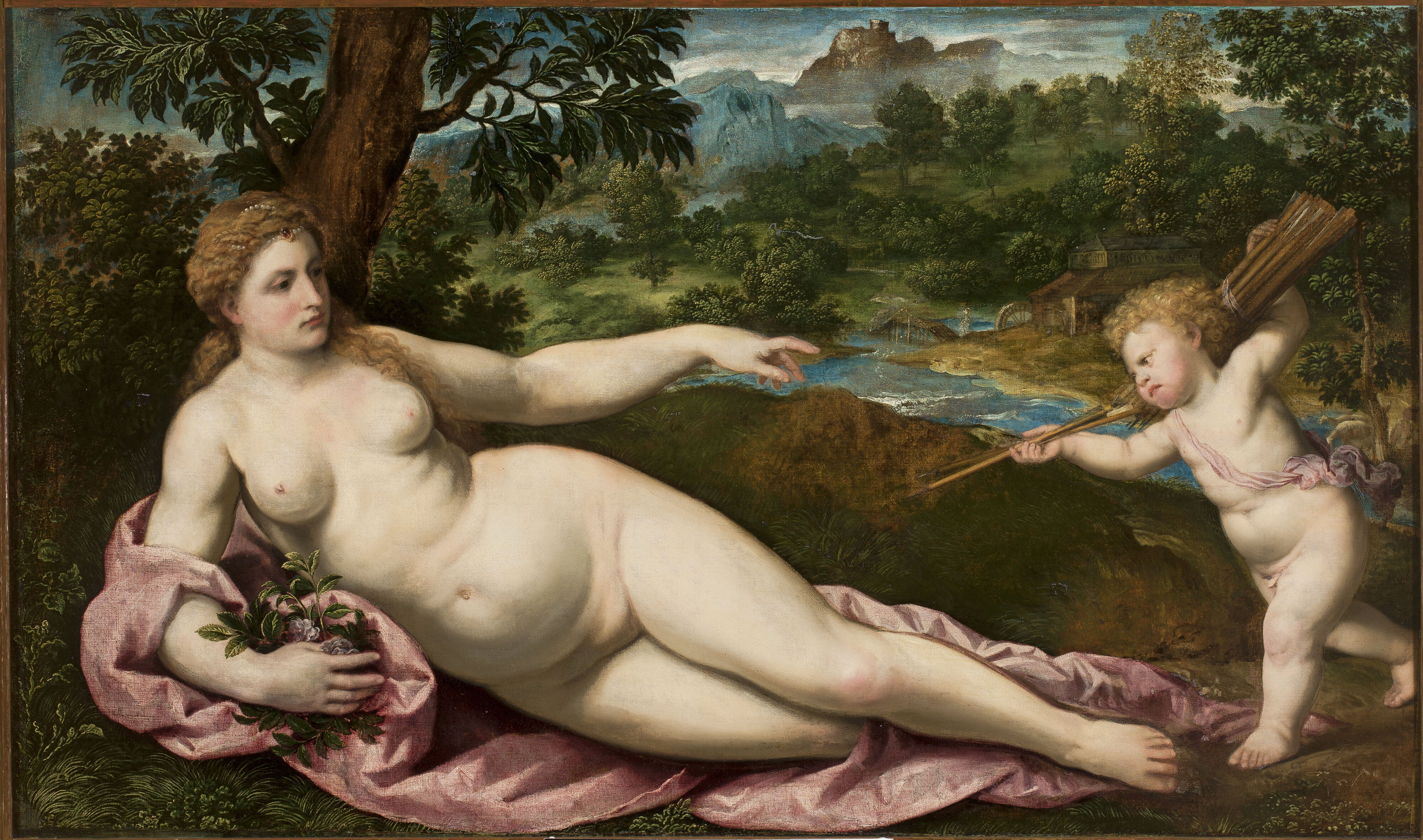
Venus and Amor by Paris Bordone, that adorned the "Great Hall", was ceded after the war to the National Museum in Warsaw.

The area became a German tourist attraction during the mid-1930s, after Hitler came to power as dictator. Visitors gathered at the end of the driveway or on nearby public paths in the hope of catching a glimpse of Hitler. This led to the introduction of severe restrictions on access to the area and other security measures. A large contingent of the Leibstandarte SS Adolf Hitler was housed in barracks adjacent to the Berghof. Under the command of Obersturmbannführer Bernhard Frank, they patrolled an extensive cordoned security zone that encompassed the nearby homes of the other Nazi leaders. With the outbreak of war extensive anti-aircraft defences were also installed, including smoke-generating machines to conceal the Berghof complex from hostile aircraft.

The nearby former hotel "Türken" was turned into quarters to house the Reichssicherheitsdienst (Reich Security Service; RSD) SS security men who patrolled the grounds of the Berghof. It was later occupied by the Generalmajor of the Police. (The hotel was rebuilt in 1950 and reopened as a hotel before Christmas, the Hotel zum Türken. Visitors can still explore the historic underground hallways and tunnels that had been used by the Nazis.)

Whenever Hitler was in residence, members of the RSD and Führerbegleitkommando (Führer Escort Command; FBK) were present. While the RSD men patrolled the grounds, the FBK men provided close security protection for Hitler. Several Wehrmacht mountain troop units were also housed nearby. Hence, the British never planned a direct attack on the compound.

=== Guests ===
Guests at the Berghof included political figures, monarchs, heads of state, and diplomats along with painters, singers, and musicians. The important visitors personally greeted on the steps of the Berghof by Hitler included David Lloyd George (3 March 1936), the Aga Khan (20 October 1937), Duke and Duchess of Windsor (22 October 1937), Kurt von Schuschnigg (12 February 1938), Neville Chamberlain (15 September 1938), and Benito Mussolini (19 January 1941). At the end of July 1940, Hitler summoned his military chiefs from OKW and OKH to the Berghof for the 'Berghof Conference' at which the 'Russian problem' was studied. On 11 May 1941, Karlheinz Pintsch visited the Berghof to deliver a letter from Rudolf Hess informing Hitler of his illegal flight to Scotland.

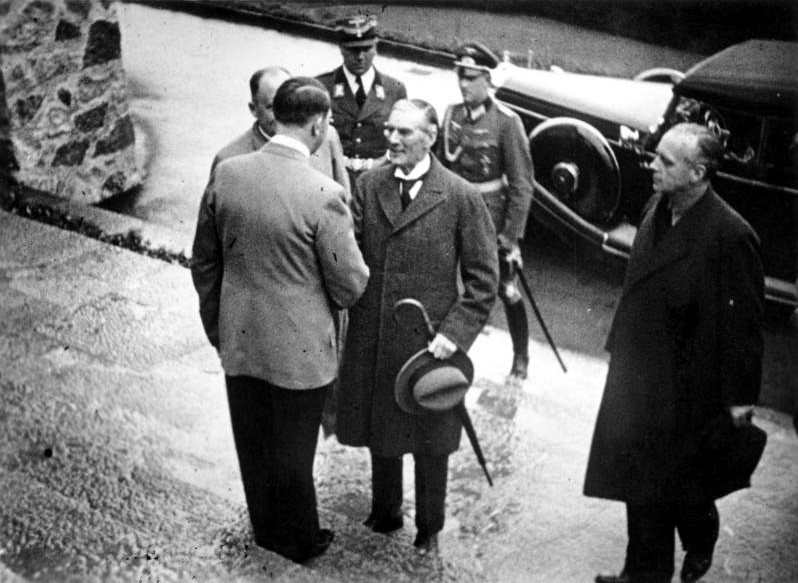
Adolf Hitler greets British Prime Minister Neville Chamberlain on the steps of the Berghof.

Hitler's social circle at his Berghof retreat – which his intimates referred to as "on the Berg" – included Eva Braun and her sister Gretl, Herta Schneider and her children, Eva's friend Marion Schönmann, Heinrich Hoffmann, and the wives and children of other Nazi leaders and Hitler's staff who would all pose for an annual group photograph on the occasion of Hitler's birthday.. Household employees at the Berghof recount working for Hitler to be a positive experience—with one calling him "a good man to us"—and claim to have known nothing about the Holocaust and the other war crimes committed by the Nazi Party. The social scene at the Berghof ended on 14 July 1944, when Hitler left for his military headquarters in East Prussia, never to return.

Silent colour films shot by Eva Braun survived the war and showed Hitler and his guests relaxing at the Berghof. In 2006, computer lip-reading software transcribed several parts of their conversations. Among those identified in the films were Joseph Goebbels, Reinhard Heydrich, Heinrich Himmler, Joachim von Ribbentrop, Albert Speer, and Karl Wolff.

Two guests planned to use a visit to the Berghof as an opportunity to assassinate Hitler. On 11 March 1944, Captain Eberhard von Breitenbuch arrived with a concealed pistol with the intention of shooting Hitler in the head, but guards would not allow him into the same room. On 7 June 1944, Colonel Claus Schenk Graf von Stauffenberg planned to detonate a bomb at a meeting there, but his fellow conspirators would not give him approval to do so because Himmler and Hermann Göring were not also present.

=== British assassination plan ===
The Allies rejected suggestions about derailing Hitler's train to Obersalzberg and using poison in the train's drinking water, but the British developed a plan named Operation Foxley in 1944. This called for a sniper to kill Hitler on his daily 15–20 minute walk from the Berghof residence to the Teehaus on the Mooslahnerkopf Hill, which had been revealed by a prisoner of war. The operation would be undertaken by a German-speaking Pole and a British sniper wearing German uniforms after being parachuted into Austria. They would be housed and led to the area by an anti-Nazi, identified as "Heidentaler" who lived nearby in Salzburg. The Foxley plan did not proceed, due to a dispute as to whether killing Hitler was a prudent idea and the lack of intelligence about his exact daily routine. By the time that the plan might have proceeded, Hitler had stopped visiting his mountain retreat; he never returned to the compound after 14 July 1944.

== Post-war ruins ==
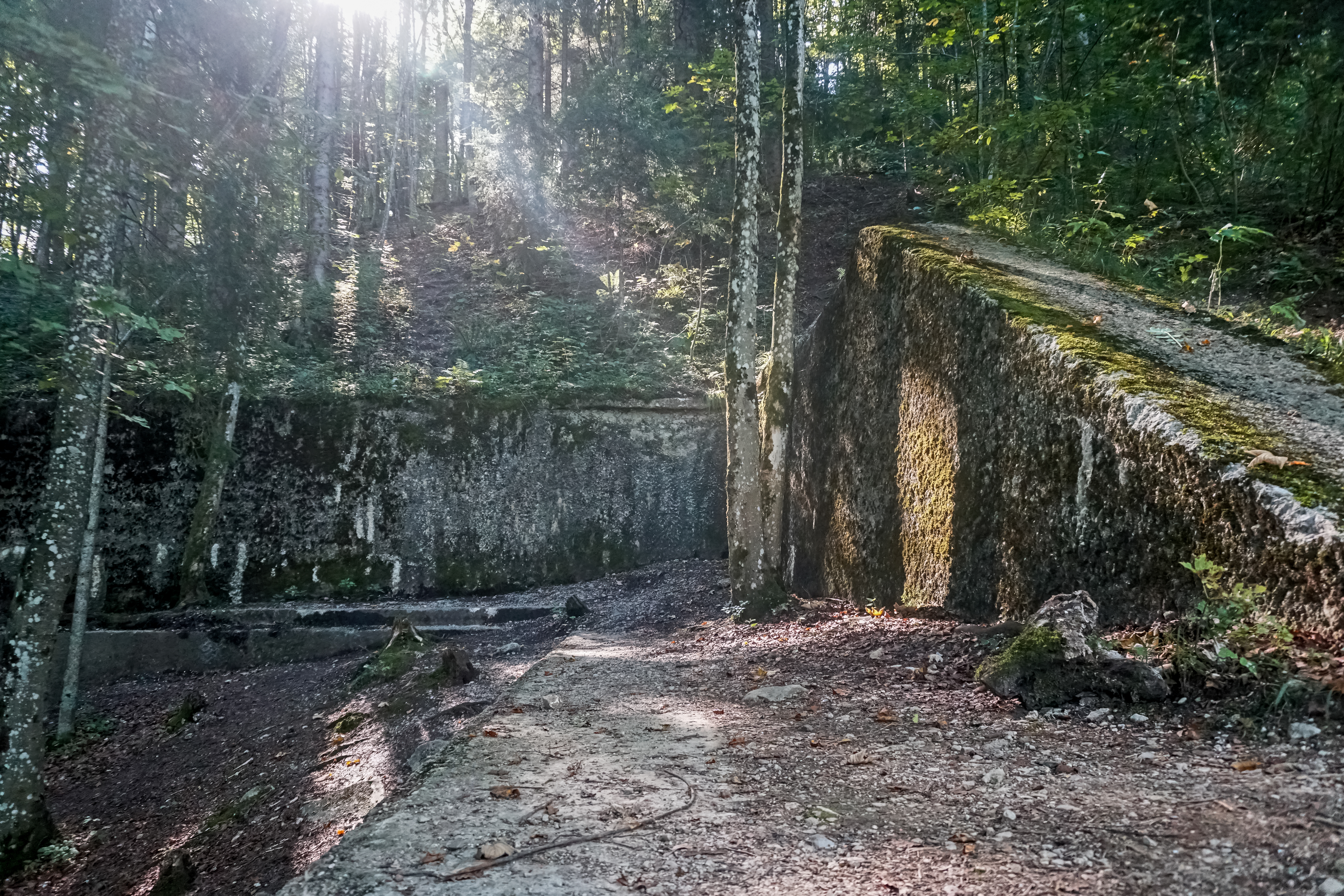
The remnants of the Berghof in 2019

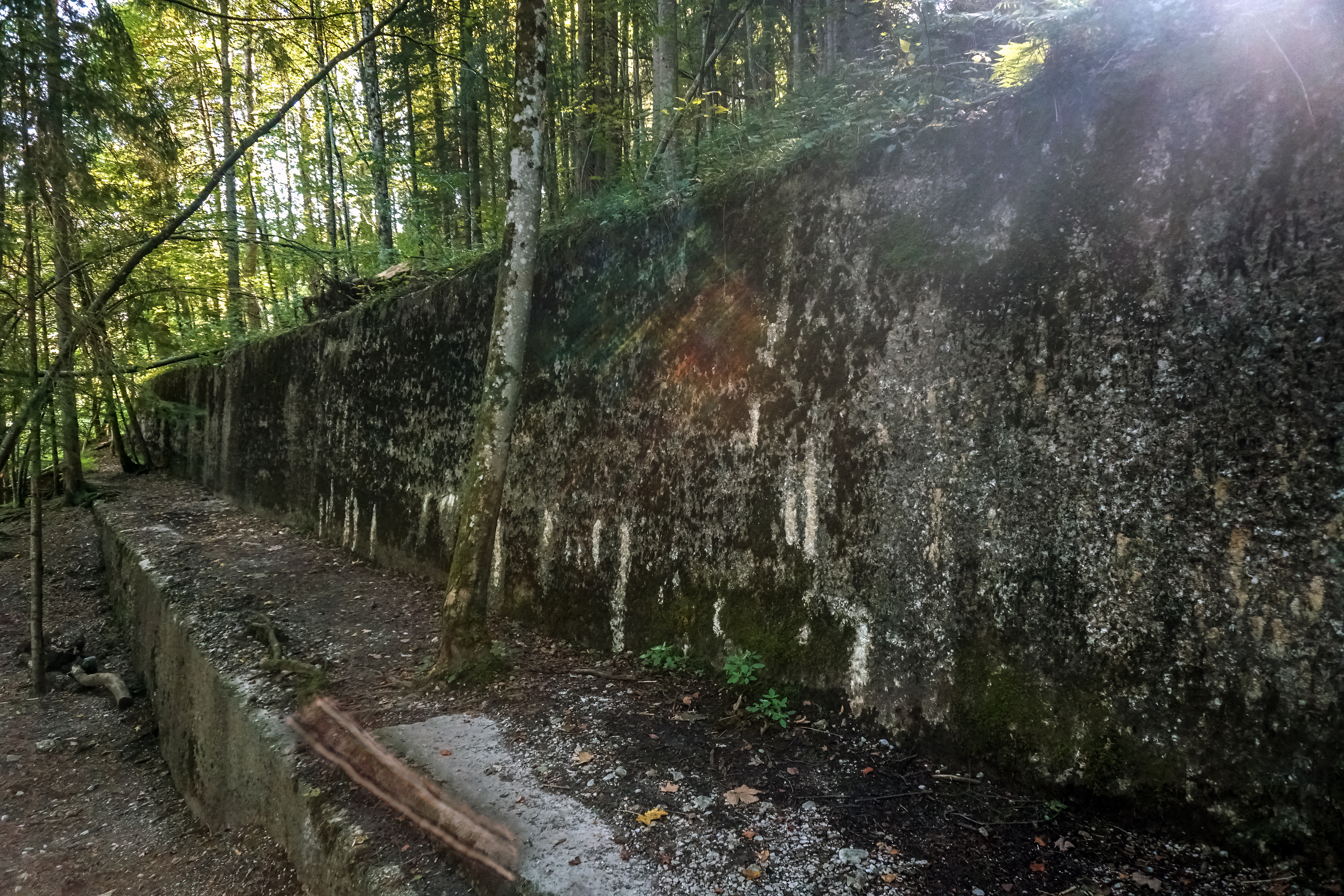
One of the few sections of the retaining wall left at the Berghof site

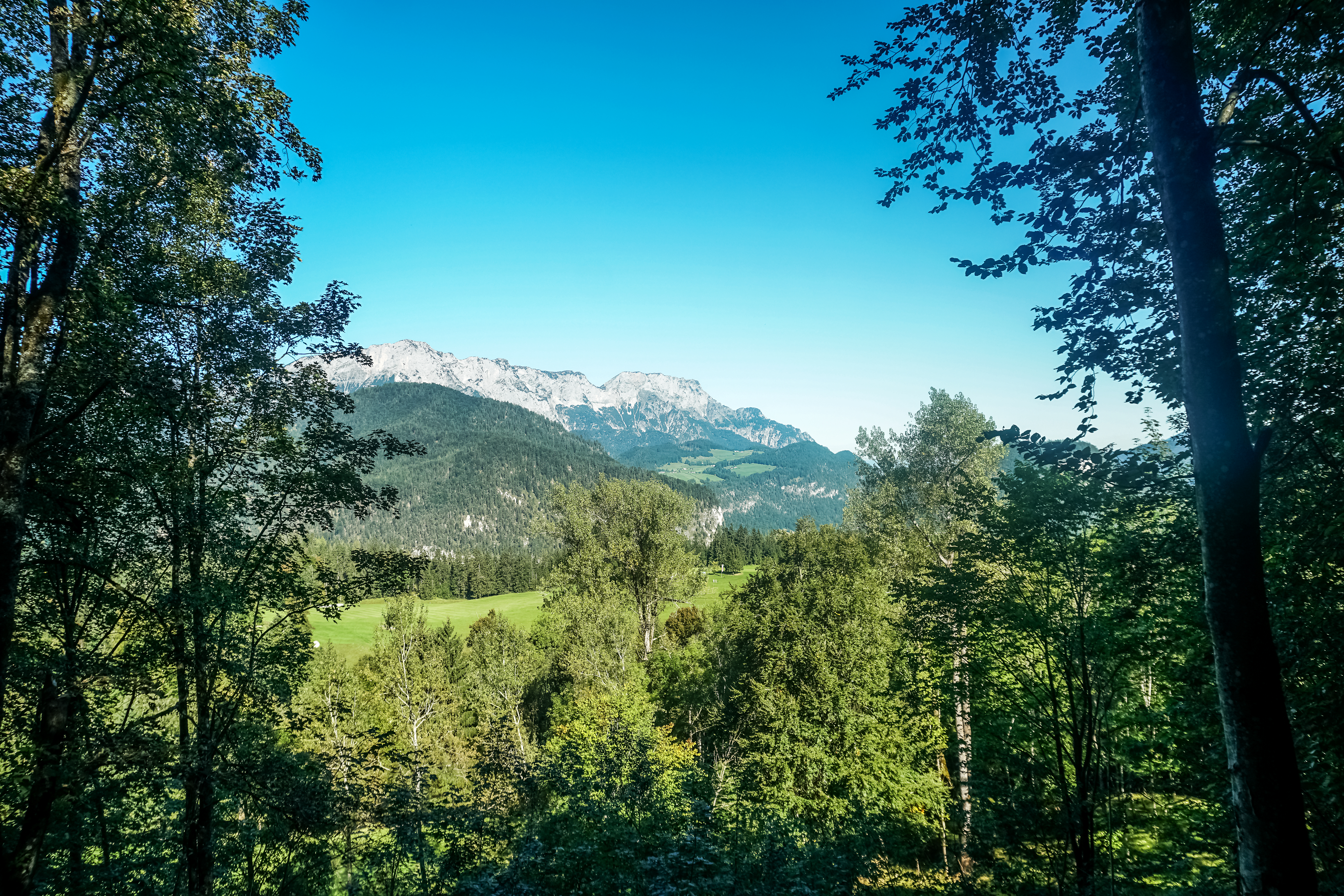
View out of the "Great Window", September 2019

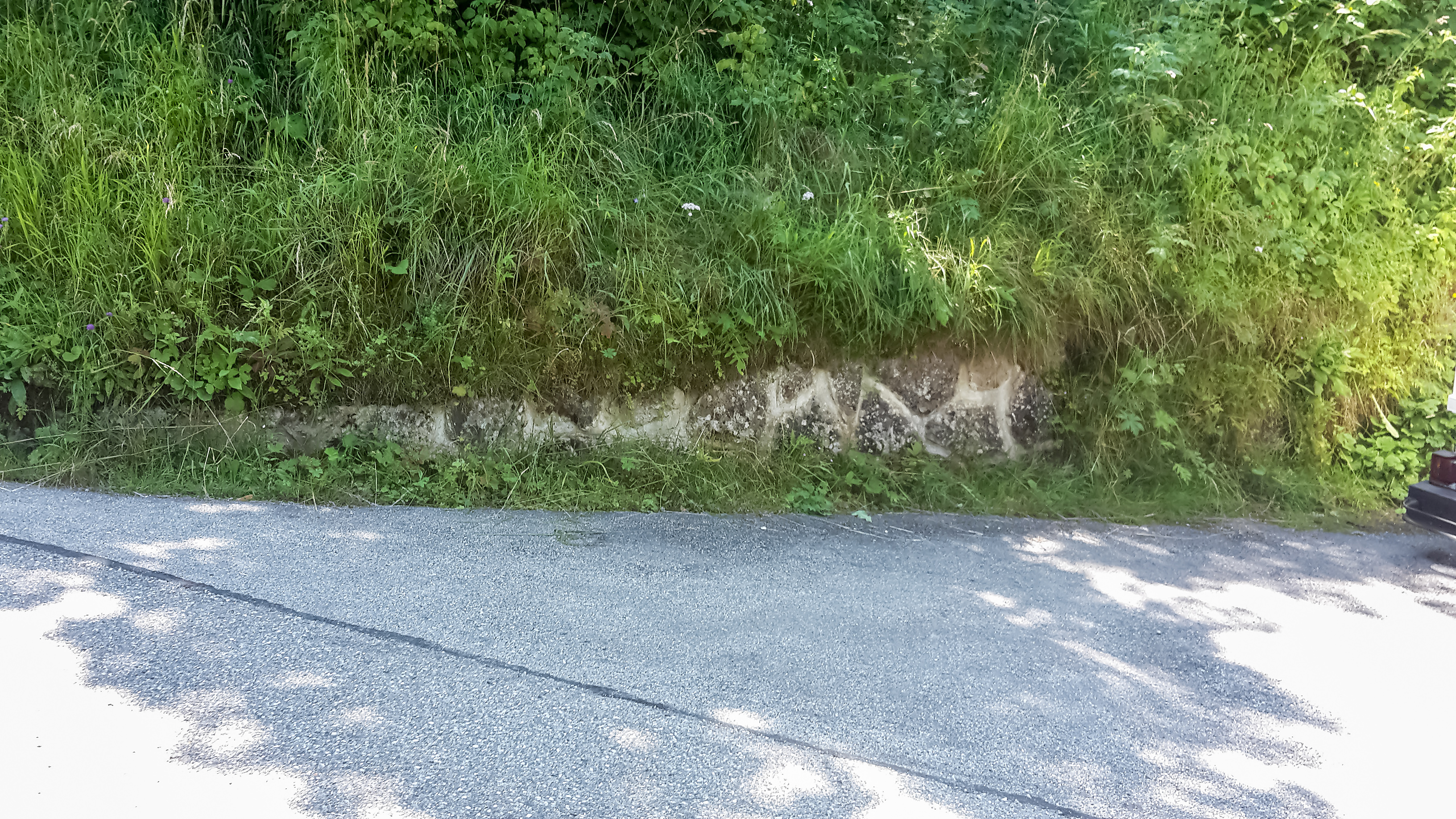
Remains of the left wall of the driveway to the main entrance

The Obersalzberg was bombed by hundreds of British RAF Lancaster heavy bombers, including aircraft from No. 617 Squadron RAF (the "Dambusters"), which attacked Obersalzberg on 25 April 1945. At least two bombs struck the Berghof and did considerable damage to the building. Retreating SS troops set fire to the villa on 4 May, four days after Hitler's suicide in Berlin. Only hours later, the U.S. 3rd Infantry Division arrived at Berchtesgaden along with the French 2nd Armoured Division. The Americans having only invested the town of Berchtesgaden, the French took advantage of this to attack Obersalzberg where the Berghof was located. In their Jeep, Captain Laurent Touyeras and his driver, Brigadier François Borg, overtook the half-tracks of the 2nd DB which were struggling to climb the slope. They were thus the first Allied soldiers to reach the chalet which was still burning. The French discovered kilometers of underground bunkers housing art objects looted from all over Europe, but also thousands of bottles of fine wines, tons of provisions and more surprising pieces, such as a collection of bras amassed by Göring. Allied soldiers thoroughly looted and stripped the house over the next few days. The American 1st Battalion of the 506th Infantry Regiment arrived on 8 May. The 3rd Battalion of the 506th came into Berchtesgaden by a different route and sustained casualties in a skirmish with the crews of two German 88mm anti-aircraft/anti-tank guns. One of the most notable artifacts taken by American soldiers was the Columbus Globe for State and Industry Leaders, known more commonly as "Hitler's Globe".

The teahouse on Mooslahnerkopf hill was unscathed in the April 1945 bombing raid, but the Bavarian government knocked it down by 1951 because of its link with Hitler. For 55 years, the ruins lay in the woods by the 13th hole of the Gutshof golf course, but these were taken away altogether during the summer of 2006. The Berghof's shell survived until 1952, when the Bavarian government demolished it with explosives on 30 April. The Berghof, the houses of Göring and Bormann, the SS barracks, the Kampfhäusl, and the teahouse were all destroyed. This had been part of an agreement under which the Americans handed the area back to the Bavarian authorities. There was fear that the ruins would become a neo-Nazi shrine and tourist attraction.

More than 50 Obersalzberg Nazi buildings were destroyed. The Platterhof had been a nearby hostel for visitors to the area, and it was turned into the General Walker Hotel for American troops after the war. It was demolished in 2001.

== Location of the Berghof and Hitler's other headquarters ==
The Berghof was one of the headquarters used by Hitler during the war. There were about 14 known completed Führer Headquarters.

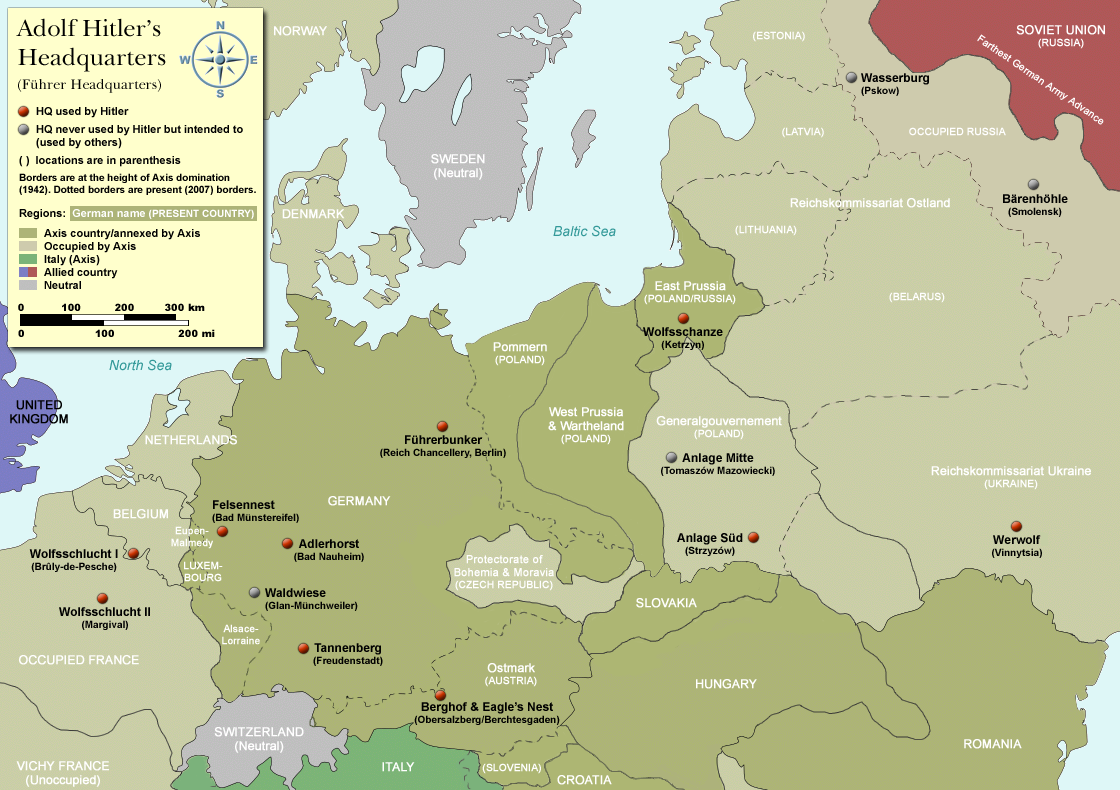
Map showing the location of the Berghof, along with Führer Headquarters throughout Europe

== See also ==
- Führer Headquarters
- Kehlsteinhaus
- Man Hunt (1941 film), a Fritz Lang film set in 1939 about a hunter aiming at Hitler
  - Based on Rogue Male (novel)
- Nazi architecture
- Operation Foxley, a British Special Operations Executive (SOE) plan to assassinate Hitler in 1944
- Traudl Junge
- Berghof (Argentina), a ski school near Bariloche derives its name from the Obersalzberg residence.

== Sources ==
- Eberle, Henrik; Uhl, Matthias. The Unknown Hitler.
- Guido, Pietro (2013). Hitler's Berghof and the Tea-House (2nd ed.). Milan: ISEM. ISBN 978-88-87077-07-0.
- Stratigakos, Despina (2015). Hitler at Home. New Haven: Yale University Press. ISBN 978-0-300-18381-8
- Stratigakos, Despina (September 2015). "Hitler at Home", Places Journal.
- Walden, Geoffrey R. (2014). Hitler's Berchtesgaden: A Guide to Third Reich Sites in the Berchtesgaden and Obersalzberg Area. Fonthill Media. ISBN 978-1-78155-226-1.
- Wilson, James (2005). Hitler's Alpine Retreat. Barnsley, S. Yorkshire, England: Pen & Sword Military. ISBN 1-84415-263-4. 271 photos of the Obersalzberg complex and biographies of leading Nazi figures.
- Döhring, Herbert (2018). Living with Hitler:Accounts of Hitler's Household Staff (1st ed.). Berlin: Pen & Sword. ISBN 9781784382971.
