= Rogue Male (1976 film) =

1976 television film directed by Clive Donner

- Based on: Rogue Male by Geoffrey Household
- Screenplay by: Frederic Raphael
- Directed by: Clive Donner
- Starring: Peter O'Toole; John Standing; Alastair Sim; Harold Pinter
- Composer: Christopher Gunning
- Original language: English

Production
- Producer: Mark Shivas
- Cinematography: Brian Tufano
- Editor: Dan Rae
- Camera setup: Single camera
- Running time: 100m
- Production company: BBC

Original release
- Network: BBC Two
- Release: 22 September 1976

Rogue Male is a 1976 British television film directed by Clive Donner and starring Peter O'Toole, Alastair Sim (in his last film role), John Standing and Harold Pinter. Made by the BBC, it was adapted by Frederic Raphael based on Geoffrey Household's 1939 novel Rogue Male. It was first broadcast on 22 September 1976.

== Plot ==
In early 1939, before the start of the Second World War, Sir Robert Hunter takes aim at Adolf Hitler with a hunting rifle but hesitates to shoot and is tackled by a Schutzstaffel (SS) guard. Captured and tortured by the Gestapo, he claims that his aiming at Hitler was simply an intellectual exercise, to see if it could be done. Because of his high status in Britain, his captors intend to shoot him and cover it up as a hunting accident but because his body displays clear evidence of torture, they decide instead to throw him off of a cliff to disguise the signs.

Hunter survives the fall and with the aid of a German fisherman and a friendly sailor, makes his way back to England. He soon discovers that German agents are after him and that the Nazi government has requested his extradition. After killing a pursuer by electrocuting him on the London Underground, Sir Robert goes underground in rural England to escape his pursuers. It is revealed through flashbacks that his girlfriend, who played a role in organising the German Resistance, was executed by the Nazi government.

Hunter's lead pursuer, an English Nazi sympathiser, Major Quive-Smith, tracks him to his lair and sadistically traps him within it. Rather than kill Hunter, Quive-Smith offers to spare his life if he signs a false confession stating that he attempted to assassinate Hitler on behalf of British intelligence. Over the course of several days, Hunter constructs a rudimentary crossbow, lures Quive-Smith into looking down his breathing hole and shoots him in the head, killing him.

Soon afterwards, Britain declares war against Germany, and Hunter, now with his status restored, agrees to discuss with the Admiralty a secret mission (implied to be a Operation Foxley another attempt on Hitler's life).

== Cast ==
- Peter O'Toole as Sir Robert Hunter
- John Standing as Major Quive-Smith
- Alastair Sim as the Earl
- Harold Pinter as Saul Abrahams
- Michael Byrne as interrogator
- Mark McManus as Vaner
- Ray Smith as fisherman
- Hugh Manning as Peale
- Robert Lang as Jessel
- Cyd Hayman as Rebecca
- Ian East as Muller
- Philip Jackson as 1st seaman
- Nicholas Ball as 2nd seaman
- Maureen Lipman as Freda
- Ray Mort as Gerald
- Michael Sheard as Hitler
- Shirley Dynevor as Eva Braun
- Ivor Roberts as Drake
- John Ringham as SS officer

== Background ==
The novel had been filmed in 1941 by Fritz Lang, as Man Hunt, with Walter Pidgeon in the lead role. According to the producer, Mark Shivas, the script editor, Richard Broke, had the idea of making six TV movie thrillers for the BBC which showed the changing nature of the British hero from 1918 to 1939, with Rogue Male to be the last. Shivas was working on an adaptation of The Glittering Prizes with the writer, Frederic Raphael and commissioned him to adapt Rogue Male. Raphael went back to the novel and ignored the 1941 film. Shivas felt there were three things any version of Rogue Male had to have, the attempted assassination of Adolf Hitler at the beginning of the story, the chase on the London Underground and the battle underground at the end. Filming took 25 days and involved 29 locations. Shivas would make two others in the series, She Fell Among Thieves and The Three Hostages.

Interviewed by the Radio Times for the first screening of the film, Household acknowledged that he always intended the protagonist's target to be Hitler, "Although the idea for Rogue Male germinated from my intense dislike of Hitler, I did not actually name him in the book as things were a bit tricky at the time and I thought I would leave it open so that the target could be either Hitler or Stalin. You could take your pick". It was reported that Peter O'Toole had agreed to be cast in Rogue Male partly because the original novel was a favourite of his wife Sian Phillips.

== Production ==
Some of the filming took place around King's Stag in Dorset, including the area around a local pub, The Fox Inn, Court Hill, Corscombe, Dorset.
As a TV production, the film was made on a relatively tight budget and the crew was paid at the lower rates applicable to TV productions.

== Release and reception ==
Despite its low budget, the finished film was regarded by the BBC as being suitable for a cinema release internationally. This had the potential to cause legal and industrial problems in the UK, because the crew had not been paid at the rate applicable to cinema releases. The BBC decided to terminate screenings in the UK and disallow future screenings in the UK. In an interview with Francine Stock for BBC Radio 4's Film Programme in 2007, Peter O'Toole named the film as his favourite among those that he had made.
