= Rough Shoot =

1953 film by Robert Parrish

- American theatrical poster
- Directed by: Robert Parrish
- Screenplay by: Eric Ambler
- Based on: Geoffrey Household (novel, A Rough Shoot)
- Produced by: Raymond Stross
- Starring: Joel McCrea; Evelyn Keyes; Herbert Lom
- Cinematography: Stanley Pavey
- Edited by: Russell Lloyd
- Music by: Hans May
- Production company: Raymond Stross Productions
- Distributed by: United Artists
- Release date: 15 May 1953 ((US))
- Running time: 88 minutes
- Country: United Kingdom
- Language: English

Rough Shoot, released in the USA as Shoot First, is a 1953 British thriller film directed by Robert Parrish and written by Eric Ambler, based on the 1951 novel by Geoffrey Household. The film stars Joel McCrea, in his only postwar non-Western role, with Evelyn Keyes as the leading lady, and featuring Herbert Lom, Marius Goring and Roland Culver. The scenario is set in Cold War England when tensions ran high regarding spying.

== Plot ==
A U.S. Army colonel Robert Taine living in the English countryside shoots at a man he takes to be a poacher on Taine's rented property in Dorset.

The man named Reimann, has been mortally wounded but Robert is unaware that a foreign spy named Hiart simultaneously shot Reimann. Believing he has killed the poacher, Robert hides Reimann's body under a shrub. Robert encounters Hiart and his driver, Diss looking for the body.

Later that night, Hiart's colleague, Magda Hassingham, discusses the incident with him. Magda's drunkard husband, the major landowner in the area, is ignorant of her involvement with enemy agents.

Intending to bury Reimann the next day, Robert finds Peter Sandorski, a Polish operative for British military intelligence. Sandorski enlists his help with a secret operation to foil a gang out to steal atomic secrets. British Colonel Cartwright introduces Robert and his wife Cecily to government official Randall who confirms Sandorski's identity and story and instructs Robert to cooperate with Sandorski.

When Randall leaves, Robert confesses to Cecily he has accidentally killed a man. Cecily insists on accompanying her husband and Sandorski to a nearby field where an enemy agent is expected to land an aircraft. While Cecily stays in the car, Robert and Sandorski see Hiart, Magda and their assistants arrange landing beacons.

When he overhears that the agent, identified as Lex, will only be in town for 48 hours, Sandorski decides to capture him. By moving a beacon, the landing is disrupted, allowing Sandorski who is impersonating Hiart to grab the spy. Sandorski tosses grenades so they cannot be followed.

While Robert and Cecily impersonate the Hassinghams, Sandorski drugs Lex so he will sleep. The next morning police discover Reimann's body. Diss, meanwhile, attempts to locate Lex and learns about Robert and Cecily's unusual houseguests from their housekeeper's son, Tommy Powell (Robert Dickens). After police inspectors Matthews of Dorchester and Sullivan of Scotland Yard question Robert and take one of his boots to compare to the prints found near Reimann's body. Robert insists they all leave for London, where Lex has a meeting.

On Robert's instruction, Mrs. Powell contacts Randall with a request to call off Scotland Yard. Hiart pursues Robert, Cecily, Sandorski and Lex who arrive at a train station where Randall makes contact with Cecily, who admits that her husband killed Reimann.

While on the train to London, Cecily takes Lex's briefcase while he is asleep. At the London train station Hiart manages to alert Lex, who escapes. However, the next day at London's Madame Tussaud's Wax Museum, Randall and Sandorski arrest Lex after he passes an envelope to an unidentified spy. Lex and the spy are arrested, but Hiart and Diss flee.

Sandorski shoots Diss during a pursuit in a stairwell, and Hiart is killed when he opens Lex's briefcase, triggering an explosion. Randall later reveals to Robert and Cecily that Lex, a scientist, was brought to England to interpret stolen reports about British atomic weapons trials in Australia. He and Sullivan then inform a relieved Robert that it was Hiart who killed Reimann. Before departing, Sandorski cautions Cecily that any future strange behaviour by her husband may be related to espionage.

== Cast ==
- Joel McCrea as Lt. Col. Robert Taine
- Evelyn Keyes as Cecily Taine
- Herbert Lom as Peter Sandorski
- Roland Culver as Randall
- Marius Goring as Hiart
- Frank Lawton as Hassingham
- Patricia Laffan as Magda Hassingham
- Cyril Raymond as Cartwright
- Karel Stepanek as Diss
- Jack McNaughton as Inspector Matthews
- Clement McCallin as Inspector Sullivan
- David Hurst as Lex
- Denis Lehrer as Reimann
- Laurence Naismith as Blossom
- Megs Jenkins as Mrs. Powell
- Robert Dickens as Tommy
- Arnold Bell as Sergeant Baines
- Ellis Irving as Wharton
- Joan Hickson as Station announcer

== Production ==
Inspired by Geoffrey Household's novel A Rough Shoot (1953), Shoot First! was filmed on location in England. Studio work took place at Riverside Studios, London. Some scenes were shot in Madame Tussaud's Wax Museum in London. (Note: Hollywood stars Joel McCrea and Evelyn Keyes took on lead roles in a British thriller. For McCrea, Rough Shoot would be his only film after 1946 that was not a western.)

== Reception ==
In a contemporary review of Shoot First (the title of the U.S. release), Variety magazine wrote: "McCrea is excellent as the colonel forced by circumstances into the counterplot, and Keyes is appealing and believable as his wife. Lom scores as the swash-buckling counterspy, making a completely engaging character out of what's intended as a caricature. Goring scores as the fanatic foreign agent, and Karl Stepanek is excellent as his brutal sidekick. Robert Parrish's inventive direction keeps the story moving at a rapid pace."

Film reviewer Leslie Halliwell in Leslie Halliwell's Film Guide (1989), noted that Rough Shoot was a "minor Hitchcock-style thriller with a climax in Madame Tussauds; generally efficient and entertaining."
