= Karlheinz Pintsch =

SS officer, adjutant to Rudolf Hess (b. 1909)

Karlheinz Pintsch (born 1909 – fl. 1955) was the long serving senior adjutant to Rudolf Hess, who was the Deputy Führer to Adolf Hitler in Nazi Germany. It fell on him to report Hess's illegal May 1941 flight to Scotland to Hitler and his recollections and notes have been the subject of debate by historians.

Pintsch entered the Nazi Party in 1925 and in 1934 he became the adjutant to Hess, attaining the rank of Sturmbannführer (major). He accompanied him on visits to Augsburg-Haunstetten airfield where he was learning to fly the aircraft that he flew to Scotland on 10 May 1941. Before he departed on his mission, Hess gave Pintsch a sealed letter for him to deliver personally to Adolf Hitler if he did not return within four hours and Pintsch handed it to him at the Berghof in Bavaria at noon the next day. Albert Speer who was in the vicinity recalled that Hitler bellowed for Martin Bormann after reading the letter.

Bormann ordered the arrest of Hess's associates and Pintsch was cashiered from the SS and interrogated by the Gestapo. He was then jailed for his knowledge of the flight and held in solitary confinement, as was Hess’s other adjutant Alfred Leitgen. On 7 August 1941, Hess wrote to his wife and included a letter to Pintsch in which he said he had heard rumours that he had been arrested and thanked him for his loyalty and his silence.

Pintsch was released from prison in 1944 to serve on the Eastern Front and was promoted to lieutenant. He was captured by the Red Army, betrayed by another prisoner and interrogated by the NKVD at length. They reportedly tried to elicit a confession by breaking his fingers and as a consequence he was no longer able to use a knife and fork. He was released with 600 other prisoners of war at Camp Friedland, Lower Saxony, after 11 years in Soviet captivity on 16 December 1955. He was interviewed by Lord Beaverbrook's former private secretary, the Daily Express foreign correspondent James Leasor, and was interviewed for a 1962 book by Leasor that was entitled Rudolf Hess: The Uninvited Envoy.

A 28-page notebook written by Pintsch in captivity in 1948 was discovered in a Moscow archive in 2010 by historians. It suggested that Hitler was in on the mission by Hess and interrogation transcripts found in the same archive record his recollection that when Hitler had read Hess's letter he remarked calmly: "At this particular moment in the war that could be a most hazardous escapade". However, Pintsch wrote the statement in 1948 when still a prisoner of war in the Soviet Union and may have used his claims as a means of attaining his freedom. With the start of the Cold War, it is possible that Pintsch knew that any information hinting at secret British dealings with Nazi Germany would have been welcomed by the suspicious, neurotic Joseph Stalin.
