= The Three Sentinels =

1972 novel by Geoffrey Household

- First edition (publ. Michael Joseph)
- Author: Geoffrey Household
- Language: English
- Publication date: 1972

The Three Sentinels is a 1972 novel by Geoffrey Household.

The "Three Sentinels" of the title are three deep, surging oil wells perched on a barren ridge of the Andes. The story involves two honorable and strong-willed men who must confront themselves, the sociology of native communities and the politics of corporations and South America.
