= Arrows of Desire (novel) =

1985 novel by Geoffrey Household

Arrows of Desire is a novella by Geoffrey Household published in 1985. It was adapted from a radio play.

== Plot ==
Seven hundred years after the Age of Destruction, Britain of the future is administered by the peaceful Euro-African Federation. Beyond the perimeter of the Foundation's settlement at Avebury, the ancient British tribes in the forest are showing signs of unrest.

== Reception ==
The short novel includes references to Roman Britain and has been interpreted as commentary on the Thatcher government, the contemporary situation in Ireland and the treatment of immigrants in England. Charles Champlin notes its "waggish good cheer".

Dave Langford reviewed Arrows of Desire for White Dwarf #92, and stated that "Even a throwaway joke about the lost lore silicon chips is contradicted by the presence of sophisticated electronics, lasers, tracker-robots resembling Jeter's slow bullet, etc. Editors are supposed to spot these things."
