= Man Hunt (1941 film) =

1941 film by Fritz Lang

- Directed by: Fritz Lang
- Written by: Dudley Nichols; Lamar Trotti
- Based on: Rogue Male; 1939 novel by Geoffrey Household
- Produced by: Kenneth Macgowan; Darryl F. Zanuck
- Starring: Walter Pidgeon; Joan Bennett; George Sanders
- Cinematography: Arthur C. Miller
- Edited by: Allen McNeil
- Music by: Alfred Newman
- Production company: Twentieth Century-Fox
- Distributed by: Twentieth Century-Fox
- Release date: June 13, 1941
- Running time: 105 minutes
- Country: United States
- Languages: English; German

Man Hunt is a 1941 American political thriller film, directed by Fritz Lang and starring Walter Pidgeon and Joan Bennett. It is based on the 1939 novel Rogue Male by Geoffrey Household and is set in Europe just prior to the Second World War. Lang had fled Germany into exile in 1933 and this was the first of his four anti-Nazi films, which include Ministry of Fear, Hangmen Also Die!, and Cloak and Dagger. It was Roddy McDowall's first Hollywood film after escaping London following the Blitz. Man Hunt was one of many films released in 1941 that were considered so pro-British that they influenced neutral members of the U.S. public to sympathize with the British side in World War II.

The film portrays Britain's prewar policy of appeasement with Germany in its willingness to extradite one of its own citizens without any defense, and its depiction of Nazi agents freely walking about London, impersonating police and terrorizing civilians.

The story was filmed again under its original title, Rogue Male (1976), by the BBC in a version starring Peter O'Toole.

== Plot ==
In July 1939, renowned British big-game hunter Captain Alan Thorndike slips through the forest undetected near the Berghof, Adolf Hitler's Bavarian retreat. With Hitler in his telescopic sight, he pulls the trigger on his unloaded rifle and gives a sardonic wave. He reflects a moment, then loads a live round, but is discovered at the last second by a guard, and the rifle goes off in their struggle.

Thorndike is beaten and taken to a high-ranking Nazi official, who is also a devoted hunter and an admirer. Thorndike explains that he was doing a "sporting stalk" purely for the thrill of going after the biggest game of all. The official dismisses the explanation and insists he confess to being an assassin for the British government. Thorndike's refusal leads to torture, but he remains steadfast and warns he can't be killed, as his brother, Lord Risborough, is a high-ranking British diplomat.

The official has Thorndike taken to a cliff and pushed off, to make his death look accidental. Thorndike survives when his knapsack gets caught in a tree, breaking his fall. He eludes his pursuers, reaches a German port, and steals a rowboat. Nearly captured by a patrol boat, he is taken aboard the Danish-registered vessel Vaner which is bound for London. The Germans find Thorndike's belongings on the rowboat and search the Vaner. Thorndike remains safely hidden with help from a British cabin boy and the Germans place an agent aboard, using Thorndike's passport to impersonate him.

Thorndike disembarks and realizes he's being followed by German agents. He hides in the apartment of a prostitute named Jerry Stokes, who lends him money so he can reach his brother. She insists on accompanying him. Thorndike travels to Lord Risborough who tells him the British government's appeasement police means he'd have to be extradited if found. Thorndike declares he will flee Britain. Jerry refuses a reward for hiding Thorndike, insisting he buy her a new hatpin to replace the one she lost when they met. She chooses a cheap chromium arrow, as she clearly has fallen in love.

The German official arrives in London masquerading as British Major Quive-Smith. When Thorndike calls on his solicitor, the Nazis are again on his trail and he's chased into a London Underground station. In a struggle with Thorndike Jones is thrown onto an electrified rail and mutilated beyond recognition by a subsequent train and misidentified by his papers as Thorndike. The real Thorndike is now hunted by British police for murder.

Thorndike tells Jerry to have Lord Risborough send him a letter care of the Lyme Regis post office. Thorndike hides in a nearby cave, and when he retrieves the letter three weeks later, he's trailed back to his lair by Quive-Smith who seals the only entrance and threatens to leave Thorndike trapped inside. He passes a written confession through an airhole, which Thorndike refuses to sign. He then slides in Jerry's beret, telling Thorndike she was killed when she refused to betray him. Quive-Smith boasts the Nazis have invaded Poland and no one will lift a finger, and Thorndike admits he subconsciously intended to kill Hitler. Fabricating a bow and an arrow shaft tipped by Jerry's hatpin, he agrees to sign the confession. Quive-Smith unblocks the entrance and waits to gun Thorndike down as he exits. Thorndike instead shoots Quive-Smith through the airhole. When Thorndike emerges, Quive-Smith wounds him before dying.

Thorndike recovers from his wounds with the war well underway. He joins the Royal Air Force as a Bomber Command crewman. On a mission over Germany, he goes AWOL, parachuting out with his hunting rifle, intent on assassinating Hitler.

== Cast ==
- Walter Pidgeon as Captain Thorndike
- Joan Bennett as Jerry Stokes
- George Sanders as Quive-Smith
- John Carradine as Mr. Jones
- Roddy McDowall as Vaner
- Ludwig Stössel as the doctor
- Heather Thatcher as Lady Risborough
- Frederick Worlock as Lord Risborough
- Roger Imhof as Captain Jensen
- Egon Brecher as the jeweler
- Lester Matthews as the major
- Holmes Herbert as Saul Farnsworthy
- Eily Malyon as the postmistress
- Arno Frey as the police lieutenant
- Frederick Vogeding as ambassador
- Wilhelm von Brincken as the harbor police chief

== Production ==
Man Hunt became the first war film to attract the attention of the Hays Office in the neutral United States. Joseph Breen was alarmed by the script, calling it a "hate film". Breen felt that in the isolationist atmosphere of the 1941 U.S., the film showed all Germans as evil, unlike other films that depicted both good non-Nazi Germans, as well as evil Nazis. Breen insisted that the Germans should not be characterized as being so brutal and that the office would pass the film only if it would "indicate" brutality rather than show it. As a result, Thorndike's torture was not shown, but the idea was made apparent to the audience.

Darryl F. Zanuck was also worried about Lang's anti-Nazi enthusiasm and banned him from the editing room. However, Lang and his associate Gene Fowler, Jr. secretly edited the film without Zanuck's approval.

Isolationists and Nazi sympathizers took issue with the film, along with That Hamilton Woman (1941) and others, describing such films as pro-British propaganda to change American public opinion about going to war.

The film features an instrumental version of "A Nightingale Sang in Berkeley Square" by Eric Maschwitz, Manning Sherwin, and Jack Strachey as a recurring romantic theme. The score's recurring theme for the Nazis was composed by the film's musical director Alfred Newman.

== Critical response ==
Bosley Crowther, writing for The New York Times in June 1941, commented that "Man Hunt rates somewhat above the run of ordinary "chase" films projecting "certain subtle psychological overtones", but "it doesn't fulfill its possibilities completely". Dave Kehr reviewing a DVD release in the same publication in 2009, commented "as agitprop the film could not be more effective", but "it also has the timeless quality of a work of pure imagination".

== Preservation ==
The Academy Film Archive preserved Man Hunt in 2000.

== Radio adaptation ==
Man Hunt was presented on Philip Morris Playhouse July 31, 1942, starring Robert Montgomery.

== See also ==
- Rogue Male, the 1976 BBC television version of Household's novel
- Operation Foxley, a British Special Operations Executive plan to assassinate Hitler in 1944
