= Geoffrey Household =

British novelist (1900–1988)

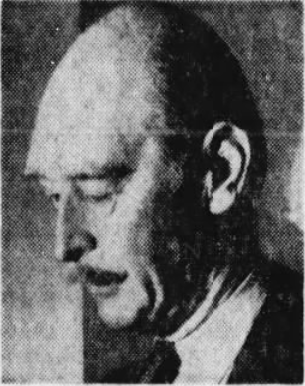
Geoffrey Household before July 1958

Geoffrey Edward West Household (30 November 1900 – 4 October 1988) was a prolific British novelist who specialized in thrillers. He is best known for his novel Rogue Male (1939).

== Personal life ==
He was born in Bristol; his father Horace was a barrister. Household was educated at Clifton College, Bristol (1914–1919), and at Magdalen College, Oxford, from which he received a B.A. in English literature in 1922. He became an assistant confidential secretary for Bank of Romania, in Bucharest (1922–1926). In 1926 he went to Spain, where he worked selling bananas as a marketing manager for the United Fruit Company (Elders and Fyffes). In 1929 Household moved to the United States where he wrote for children's encyclopedias and composed children's radio plays for the Columbia Broadcasting System. From 1933 to 1939 he was a travelling salesman for John Kidd, a manufacturer of printing ink, in Europe, the Middle East and South America. He served in British Intelligence during World War II in Romania, Greece and the Middle East.

He married twice, secondly in 1942 to Ilona Zsoldos-Gutman, by whom he had a son and two daughters.

After the War he lived the life of a country gentleman and wrote. In his later years, he lived in Charlton, near Banbury, Oxfordshire, and died in Wardington on 4 October 1988, aged 87.

== Writings ==
He began to write in the 1920s. His first short story, "El Quixote del cine' was published in The London Mercury in September 1929 under the pseudonym of David Hilcot.

His first novel The Terror of Villadonga was published in 1936. His first short story collection, The Salvation of Pisco Gabar and Other Stories, came out in 1938. In all, he wrote twenty-eight novels (including four for young adults and a novella), seven short story collections and an autobiography, Against the Wind, published in 1958. International intrigue and espionage are the focus of a large proportion of his books, including Rogue Male, The High Place (1950), A Rough Shoot (1951), Fellow Passenger (1955), Watcher in the Shadows (1960), Red Anger (1975) and The Last Two Weeks of Georges Rivac (1978).

Many of his stories have scenes set in caves, and there is a science-fiction or supernatural element in some, although this is restrained. The typical Household hero was a strong, capable Englishman with a high sense of honour which bound him to a certain course of action. He described himself, in terms of his writing, as "sort of a bastard by Stevenson out of Conrad ... Style is enormously important to me and I do try to develop my hero as a human being in trouble."

Indiana University holds a collection of Household's manuscripts and correspondence.

== Bibliography ==
=== Series ===
Raymond Ingelram

- Rogue Male (1939) (filmed as Man Hunt, 1941, and as the TV movie Rogue Male, 1976)
- Rogue Justice (1982) (a sequel to Rogue Male)

Roger Taine

- A Rough Shoot (1951) aka Shoot First (filmed as Rough Shoot, 1953)
- A Time to Kill (1951)

=== Novels ===
- The Terror of Villadonga (1936) aka The Spanish Cave (novel for young adults)
- The Third Hour (1937)
- Arabesque (1948)
- The High Place (1950)
- The Exploits of Xenophon (1955) aka Xenophon's Adventure (novel for young adults)
- Fellow Passenger (1955) aka Hang the Moon High
- Watcher in the Shadows (1960) (filmed for TV as Deadly Harvest, 1972)
- Thing to Love (1963)
- Olura (1965)
- The Courtesy of Death (1967)
- Prisoner of the Indies (1967) (novel for young adults)
- Dance of the Dwarfs (1968) (filmed as Dance of the Dwarfs, 1983)
- Doom's Caravan (1971)
- The Three Sentinels (1972)
- The Lives and Times of Bernardo Brown (1973)
- Red Anger (1975)
- The Cats to Come (1975) (novella)
- Escape into Daylight (1976) (novel for young adults)
- Hostage London: The Diary of Julian Despard (1977)
- The Last Two Weeks of Georges Rivac (1978)
- The Sending (1980)
- Summon the Bright Water (1981)
- Arrows of Desire (1985)
- Face to the Sun (1988)

=== Short story collections ===
- The Salvation of Pisco Gabar and Other Stories (1938)
- Tales of Adventurers (1952) (Story Brandy for the Parson filmed the same year)
- The Brides of Solomon and Other Stories (1958)
- Sabres on the Sand (1966)
- The Europe That Was (1979)
- Capricorn and Cancer (1981)
- The Days of Your Fathers (1987)

=== Autobiography ===
- Against the Wind (1958)

== Sources ==
- 'The Lives and Times of Geoffrey Household' by Michael Barber, in Books and Bookmen (January 1974)
- St James Guide to Crime & Mystery Writers, ed. by Jay P. Pederson (1996)
- World Authors 1900–1950, vol. 2, ed. by Martin Seymour-Smith and Andrew C. Kimmens (1996)
- Panek, Leroy L. The Special Branch: The British Spy Novel, 1890-1980 (1981), pp. 155–170
- Snyder, Robert Lance. "Confession, Class, and Conscience in Geoffrey Household's Rogue Male," Clues: A Journal of Detection 27.2 (2009): 85–94.
- Snyder, Robert Lance. "'Occult Sympathy': Geoffrey Household's Watcher in the Shadows and Dance of the Dwarfs," Connotations: A Journal for Critical Debate 22.2 (2012/2013): 301–17.
- Snyder, Robert Lance. "Romancing the Adventure: Geoffrey Household's Against the Wind as Picaresque Autobiography," Prose Studies: History, Theory, Criticism 35.3 (2013): 239–49.
- Snyder, Robert Lance. "Reading the Mythography of Terrorism in Geoffrey Household's Hostage, London: The Diary of Julian Despard." Clues: A Journal of Detection 35.1 (2017): 85–92.
