= Killing Hitler =

2003 British television programme

- BBC DVD cover
- Genre: Historical drama
- Written by: Jeremy Lovering
- Directed by: Jeremy Lovering
- Starring: Peter McDonald; Kate Ashfield; Kenneth Cranham; Keith Allen
- Narrated by: Kay Cundall
- Composer: Piers Faccini
- Country of origin: United Kingdom
- Original language: English
- No. of episodes: 2

Production
- Executive producers: Roy Ackerman; Adam Kemp; Susan Werbe
- Producers: Gordon Baskerville; Jo Ralling
- Cinematography: Katie Swain
- Editor: Luke Dunkley
- Running time: 60 minutes

Original release
- Release: 30 March 2003

Killing Hitler is a BBC historical drama examining the Operation Foxley plot to kill Adolf Hitler. Written and directed by Jeremy Lovering, it was first broadcast on 30 March 2003.

== Cast ==
- Peter McDonald as LB/X
- Kenneth Cranham as Brigadier Sir Stewart Menzies
- Kate Ashfield as Rachel Cathcart
- Keith Allen as Major General Colin Gubbins
