= Bombing of Obersalzberg =

1945 RAF Bomber Command raid on Germany

Coordinates: 47°37′52″N 13°3′21″E

- Part of World War II
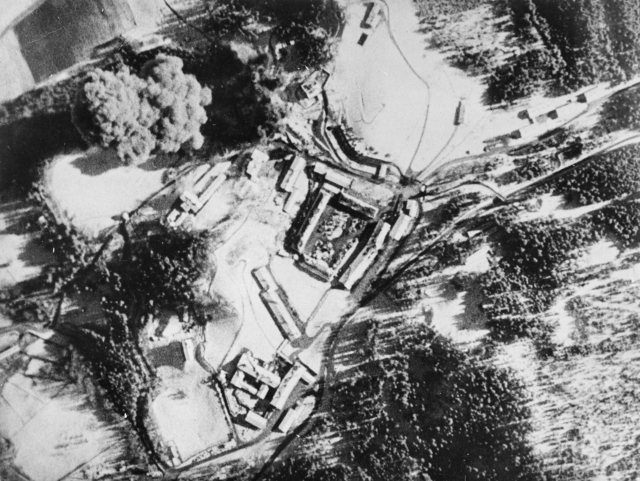
- A bomb exploding near the Berghof, Adolf Hitler's residence at Obersalzberg, on 25 April 1945
Date	25 April 1945
Location	Obersalzberg, Germany
Result	Allied victory

Belligerents
United Kingdom; United States; Australia	Germany

Strength
359 heavy bombers 16 light bombers	Anti-aircraft batteries

Casualties and losses
4 killed 2 bombers	31 killed Heavy damage to some of the targeted buildings
- Location of Obersalzberg (using 1937 borders)

The bombing of Obersalzberg was an air raid carried out by the Royal Air Force's Bomber Command on 25 April 1945 during the last days of World War II in Europe. The operation targeted Obersalzberg, a complex of residences and bunkers in Bavaria that had been built for Adolf Hitler and other key leaders of Nazi Germany. Many buildings in the complex were destroyed, though Hitler's residence and the bunker network were only slightly damaged. Two Allied bombers were shot down with the loss of four airmen, and 31 Germans were killed.

Historians have identified several motives for the attack on Obersalzberg. These include supporting Allied ground forces, demonstrating the effectiveness of the British heavy bomber force, convincing die-hard Germans that the war was lost, and obscuring the memory of pre-war appeasement policies. The attack was conducted by a large force of 359 heavy bombers in an attempt to destroy the bunkers located below Obersalzberg, from which the Allies feared that senior members of the German government would command an Alpine Fortress. After difficulties locating and marking the targets were overcome, the bombers attacked in two waves. The approximately 3,000 people at Obersalzberg sheltered in bunkers, and the nearby town of Berchtesgaden was undamaged. Hitler was in Berlin at the time of the attack and Hermann Göring, the only senior Nazi at Obersalzberg, survived.

While the raid on Obersalzberg was celebrated at the time, it is little remembered today. Most of the Allied personnel involved in the operation took satisfaction from attacking Hitler's residence, and it received extensive media coverage. As the Alpine Fortress proved to be a myth, and German resistance collapsed in the next two weeks, most post-war histories made little mention of the operation.

== Background ==
After the Nazi Party came to power in Germany, it built the Obersalzberg complex of chalets and mountain lodges near the Bavarian town of Berchtesgaden for the use of Adolf Hitler and other members of the Nazi Party's elite. Hitler usually spent more than a third of each year at Obersalzberg. Before World War II, he hosted many international leaders at his residence there, the Berghof. Hitler and British prime minister Neville Chamberlain met at the Berghof on 15 September 1938 as part of the negotiations that led to the Munich Agreement. Nazi propaganda publicised the Berghof, and it became an important symbol of Hitler's leadership in the eyes of most Germans.

During World War II, Hitler frequently visited Obersalzberg, one of his main command centres. He spent most of early 1944 there, and left for the final time on 14 July. A sophisticated network of bunkers and tunnels was constructed under the complex as Allied air raids intensified on Germany. It was defended by anti-aircraft guns and equipment that could cover the area in a smoke screen. All of its buildings were camouflaged in early 1944 to make them difficult to locate from the air.

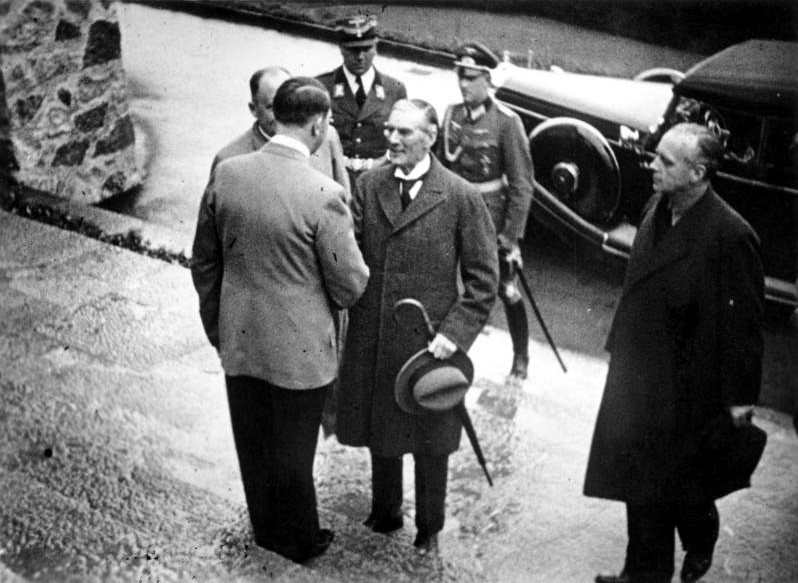
Adolf Hitler greeting Neville Chamberlain at the Berghof on 15 September 1938

The Allies considered attacking Obersalzberg before April 1945, but decided against doing so. Obersalzberg's location was well known, and in June 1944 Allied intelligence confirmed that Hitler was directing the resistance to the Normandy landings from the Berghof. The Royal Air Force (RAF) developed a plan to attack Obersalzberg that was designated "Hellbound". United States Army Air Forces (USAAF) reconnaissance aircraft photographed the area between 16 and 20 June, and the American Fifteenth Air Force prepared flight routes to attack it from bases in Allied-controlled areas of Italy. The head of the USAAF, General "Hap" Arnold decided against conducting the attack on 20 June, on the grounds that it was unlikely that Hitler would be killed, and killing him was undesirable anyway as his inept leadership of the German military was to the Allies' advantage. Arnold was also concerned that the attack force would suffer heavy casualties as the area was believed to be strongly defended. He recorded in his diary "Our secret weapon is Hitler, hence do not bomb his castle. Do not let him get hurt, we want him to continue making mistakes". The British Special Operations Executive also developed plans designated Operation Foxley but never attempted, during mid-1944 to assassinate Hitler in the Obersalzberg area using special forces personnel.

The Fifteenth Air Force proposed bombing the Berchtesgaden area in February 1945, but this was blocked by the USAAF's high command due to the difficulty of accurately hitting the target, and a continuing belief that the Allies were better off with Hitler still in command of the German military. Shortly afterwards, plans for an attack on bridges in the Berchtesgaden area by both the Eighth and Fifteenth Air Forces were developed, but never acted on.

The only attack on Berchtesgaden prior to April 1945 was made on 20 February 1945 by eight Republic P-47 Thunderbolt fighter bombers from the Fifteenth Air Force. These aircraft struck the area after being unable to complete a mission in Italy, and their commander, Major John L. Beck, was initially unaware of Berchtesgaden's importance. The Thunderbolts attacked a train, and encountered heavy anti-aircraft fire. When the attack was reported, there was disappointment among the public in Allied countries that the Berghof had not been damaged.

By April 1945, the Allies had near-complete air superiority over Germany. As a result of the weakening of the German air defences and the availability of long-ranged Allied escort fighter aircraft, the RAF's Bomber Command had been making occasional daylight raids on targets in Germany in addition to its usual night operations since late 1944. The frequency with which it conducted daylight attacks increased over time. The British Chiefs of Staff Committee directed that the area bombing of German cities cease on 16 April, with the bombers instead focusing on providing "direct support to the allied armies in the land battle" and continuing their attacks on the remnants of the German Navy. In line with this order, Bomber Command attacked German cities that lay in the path of the Allied armies, and made precision bombing raids against other targets until 25 April.

== Planning ==
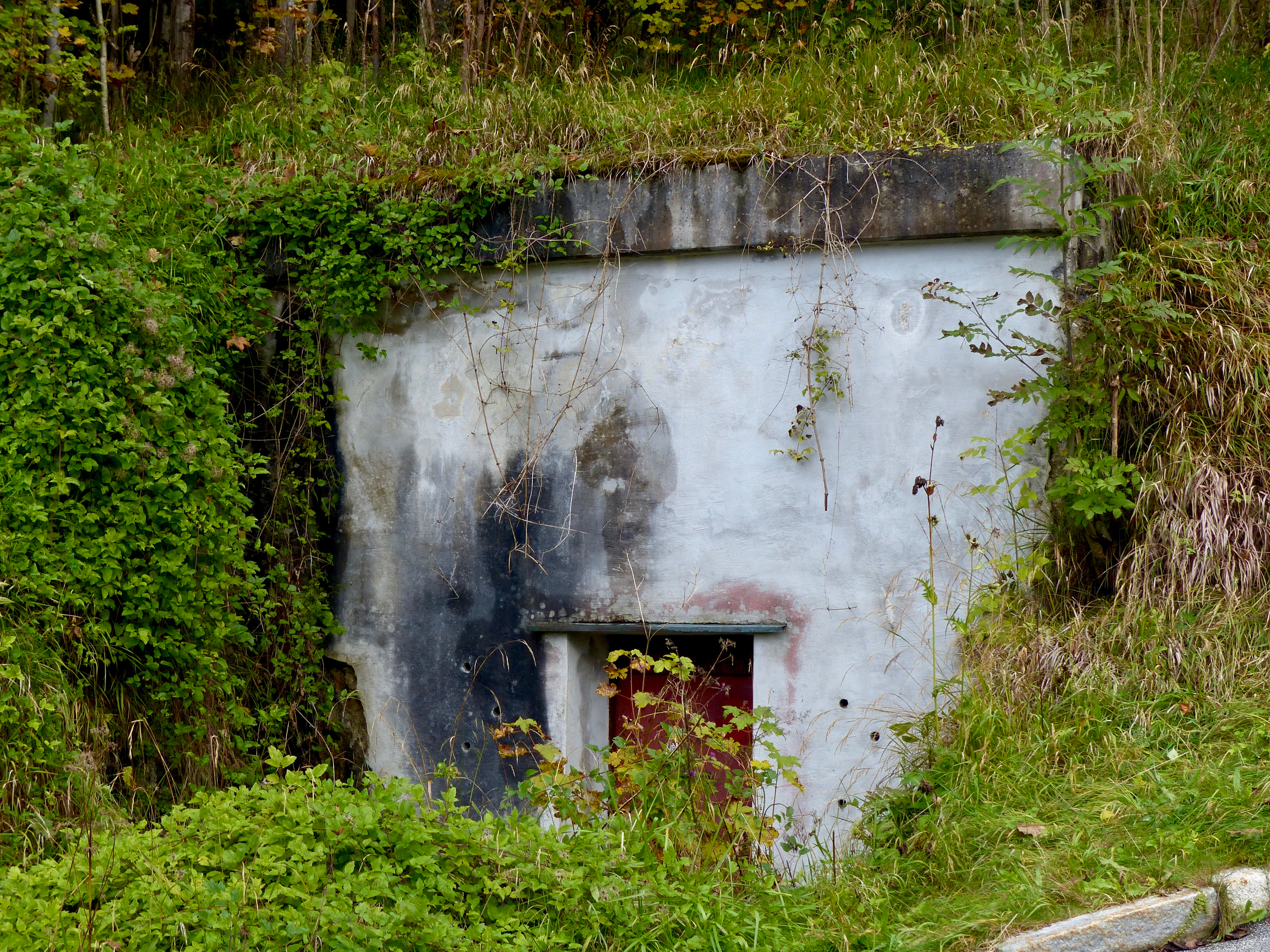
The entrance to a World War II bunker at Obersalzberg, photographed in 2016

As the war in Europe neared its end in 1945, the Supreme Headquarters Allied Expeditionary Force (SHAEF) became concerned over intelligence reports that indicated senior members of the German government as well as Waffen-SS units would assemble at Berchtesgaden to prolong the fighting from an "Alpine Fortress". This was an intelligence failure, as the Germans made few attempts to prepare defensive positions in the Alps until the last weeks of the war. Hitler sent most of his personal staff to Berchtesgaden in April, but remained in Berlin. Most of the other senior ministers fled to other parts of Germany. The former Reichsmarschall Hermann Göring was the only highly ranked member of the government at Obersalzberg at the time of the attack; he had been stripped of all his positions and was being held under house arrest there on Hitler's orders as punishment for sending a telegram to Hitler on 23 April seeking permission to assume Germany's leadership.

The decision to conduct an air raid on Obersalzberg was made in April 1945. The attack was proposed by the head of Bomber Command, Air Chief Marshal Sir Arthur Harris, and approved by SHAEF. Harris specified that the goal of the raid was to support the United States Army's XV Corps, which was rapidly advancing towards Munich from whence it would attack Berchtesgaden. Two historians have suggested that other factors motivated the raid. Oliver Haller wrote that the real reason Bomber Command conducted the attack was that Harris wanted to demonstrate that his forces could conduct precision bombing after he was criticised for terror bombing attacks on cities in early 1945. Despina Stratigakos said that the Allies hoped that the destruction of the Berghof would convince fanatical Nazis that the war was lost. She also suggested that the attack aimed to "wipe from memory" the humiliation of the pre-war appeasement policies, including the Munich Agreement, which were associated with the Berghof. The US Army opposed the attack, however, due to concerns that the complex's rubble would be easier for the Germans to defend than undamaged buildings.

The Berghof and the Kehlsteinhaus pavilion, which Hitler had occasionally used to host guests, were the raid's primary targets. Several other buildings were in the area which was to be bombed. These included the houses of other senior Nazis, a barracks used by the Waffen-SS units assigned to defend Obersalzberg and a hospital. Several secondary targets, including bridges in the city of Salzburg, were selected for the crews of aircraft which were unable to bomb Obersalzberg.

== Attack ==
The bomber crews were woken during the early hours of 25 April to be briefed, and were informed that several senior members of the German government were at Obersalzberg; some were told that Hitler was there. An attack force of 359 Avro Lancaster heavy bombers drawn from twenty-two squadrons in No. 1 and 5 Groups took off from bases in the United Kingdom that morning. They were accompanied by 16 de Havilland Mosquito light bombers from No. 8 Group whose role was to guide the bombers to the target using the Oboe navigation system. The bombers were escorted by 13 British fighter squadrons and 98 North American P-51 Mustang fighters from the Eighth Air Force.

After leaving the UK, the bombers passed near Paris, then headed directly towards Obersalzberg upon reaching Lake Constance. The aircraft flew over Allied-held territory for most of the approach flight, but the last 250 miles (400 km) were over German-controlled territory. They spent only a small amount of time within range of anti-aircraft guns during the approach flight and, as the Luftwaffe had almost ceased to exist, no fighters attempted to intercept them. Some of the Mustang pilots spotted and shot down an Arado 234 jet reconnaissance aircraft.

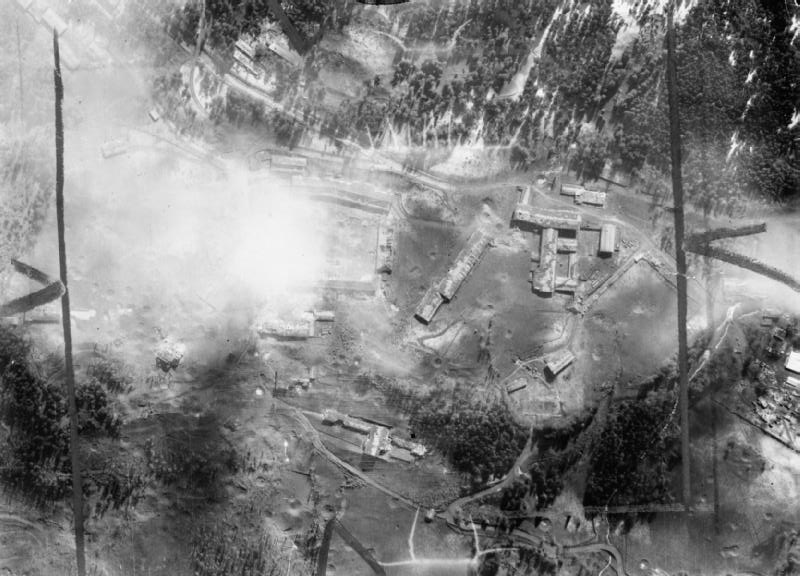
An aerial photo of Obersalzberg during the raid

The first wave of bombers arrived in the Berchtesgaden area at 9:30 am, but were unable to attack immediately. The Mosquito crews had difficulty spotting the targets due to mist and snow in the area. Obersalzberg's defenders, however, were unable to generate a smoke screen as they had exhausted their supplies of the necessary chemicals. The Mosquitos' Oboe equipment proved ineffective as the radio signals it needed to receive were blocked by mountains. The bombers orbited until the Mosquito crews marked the target. During this period some of the aircraft flew near Salzburg and were fired on by the city's strong anti-aircraft defences. Several bombers also came close to colliding.

Once the target was marked, the first wave of bombers attacked between 9:51 and 10:11 am. The elite No. 617 Squadron RAF was the first unit to strike Obersalzberg, with its aircraft dropping large Tallboy bunker-buster bombs. The second wave bombed between 10:42 and 11:00 am. Over 1,400 long tons (1,400 t) of bombs were dropped; it was hoped that such a heavy bombardment would be sufficient to destroy the bunkers under Obersalzberg. The bombing was very accurate.

Two Lancasters were shot down by German anti-aircraft guns. An aircraft from the Royal Australian Air Force's No. 460 Squadron was hit shortly after dropping its bombs; all of its crew survived after the pilot made a forced landing near the German town of Traunstein. They were made prisoners of war, but were liberated within days. The other aircraft to be shot down was from No. 619 Squadron RAF; four of the crew were killed, and three taken prisoner but soon released by Allied forces. Several other Lancasters were damaged, with one landing near Paris.

The attack produced mixed results. Of the primary targets, the Kehlsteinhaus was undamaged and the Berghof was moderately damaged by three bombs. The Waffen-SS barracks and the houses owned by Göring and the Reichsleiter Martin Bormann were destroyed. Most of the approximately 3,000 people at Obersalzberg had sheltered in the bunkers below the complex, but 31 were killed, including several children. The bunker network was not seriously damaged. The town of Berchtesgaden was undamaged, and none of its population were killed or wounded.

USAAF units attacked transport infrastructure in the general area of Obersalzberg on 25 April. These raids formed part of an operation conducted at the request of the Allied ground forces that targeted the Škoda Works munitions facilities near Pilsen in German-occupied Czechoslovakia and railways in Austria which were believed to be transporting German troops. The locations near Obersalzberg that were attacked included Freilassing, Hallein, Bad Reichenhall, Salzburg and Traunstein. Considerable damage was inflicted on several train stations, gasworks and hospitals in these towns, and more than 300 civilians were killed.

== Aftermath ==
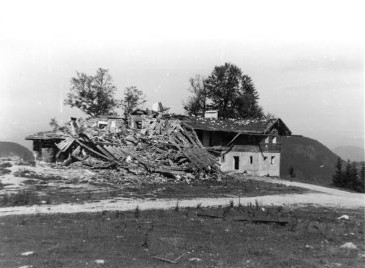
The ruins of Hermann Göring's residence at Obersalzberg in 1948

Obersalzberg was abandoned in the days after the raid. Acting on Hitler's orders, SS personnel destroyed the Berghof before pulling out. The US Army XV Corps captured the area on 4 May. Göring, who had survived the air raid, was taken prisoner by the US Army on 9 May 1945.

American and French soldiers looted Obersalzberg, including the ruins of the Berghof, after its capture. Due to Obersalzberg's associations with the Nazi leadership, the extent of this looting was unmatched by that in any other German town occupied by Allied forces. Stratigakos has observed that this contributed to memorabilia associated with Hitler being spread across the world, which partially undermined the air raid's goal of discrediting the Nazi regime. The American photojournalist Lee Miller, who arrived at Obersalzberg shortly after it was captured, commented that "there isn't even a piece left for a museum on the great war criminal, and scattered over the breadth of the world people are forever going to be shown a napkin ring or pickle fork supposedly used by Hitler".

The attack on Obersalzberg was the final combat operation for the majority of the Bomber Command squadrons dispatched. Most of the aircrew involved took satisfaction in attacking Hitler's personal home, though some expressed regret over the casualties incurred. Bomber Command's last raid, an attack on an oil refinery in Norway, was made on the night of 25/26 April. From 26 April until the end of the war on 8 May, Bomber Command aircraft were used to fly liberated prisoners of war to the UK as part of Operation Exodus, and drop food to civilians in the Netherlands during Operation Manna.

The raid attracted considerable media coverage at the time, but is little remembered today. Contemporary news reports stated that the operation had been of strategic importance as Obersalzberg had been both an alternative command centre and a symbol of the Nazi regime. The attack was portrayed as forming part of the final efforts to defeat Hitler and Germany. Media reports of the bombing also noted Chamberlain's 1938 visit to Obersalzberg. As the Alpine Fortress proved to be a myth, post-war histories, including Harris's memoirs, made little mention of the operation.

Obersalzberg remained under the US Army's administration after the war, and a recreation centre for soldiers was established there. The ruins of the Nazi-era buildings attracted neo-Nazi pilgrimages; to stop such visits, the Bavarian government destroyed the buildings on 30 April 1952, the seventh anniversary of Adolf Hitler's suicide in Berlin. The US Army closed its recreation centre and handed Obersalzberg to the Bavarian government in 1996; the other buildings in the area were demolished in the early 2000s to make way for a resort complex. The Dokumentationszentrum Obersalzberg museum, documenting Obersalzberg's history during the Nazi era, opened in 1999. A sign marking the location of the Berghof and explaining its role as a location where key decisions regarding World War II and the Holocaust were made was erected in 2008.
