= Rogue Male (novel) =

1939 novel by Geoffrey Household

- First edition
- Author: Geoffrey Household
- Language: English
- Genre: Thriller novel
- Publisher: Chatto & Windus
- Publication date: May 1939
- OCLC: 47707908

Rogue Male is a classic thriller novel by Geoffrey Household, published in 1939. The story was serialized in three issues of The Atlantic Monthly (July–September 1939). The book was reissued in 2007 with an introduction by Victoria Nelson.

The novel follows an unnamed British sportsman who is captured while aiming a rifle at an unnamed European dictator. After being tortured and left for dead, he escapes to England, where the dictator's agents pursue him into the Dorset countryside. Although the dictator is never named, Household later acknowledged that he had intended the target to be Adolf Hitler, while leaving open the possibility that it was Joseph Stalin.

The novel was adapted as Fritz Lang's film Man Hunt (1941) and the BBC television film Rogue Male (1976), starring Peter O'Toole, as well as for radio. Household published a sequel, Rogue Justice, in 1982. The book also influenced David Morrell's novel First Blood (1972).

== Plot ==
The protagonist, an unnamed British sportsman and crack shot, sets out in the spring of 1938 to see if he can get an unnamed European dictator in the sights of his rifle. Supposedly interested only in the thrill of hunting a powerful man, he convinces himself that he does not intend to pull the trigger. Caught while taking aim by officers of the dictator's secret police, he is tortured, thrown over a cliff and left for dead.

The man survives and, with civilian help, manages to make his way to a port where he stows away on a British ship bound for London. Once there, he discovers that agents of the dictator have also arrived in London with orders to kill him. In defending himself, he kills one by pushing him onto the live rail on the London Underground, after which the police launch a manhunt for him.

Unable to go to the British authorities, who will not condone assassination of a head of state, the protagonist decides to hide out in Dorset. Reports that he has been sighted reach a man named Quive-Smith, the leader of his pursuers. Seizing the opportunity, Quive-Smith finds his quarry's underground hiding place and blocks the exit, leaving only a single hole for breathing. With the protagonist thus at his mercy, Quive-Smith intends to coerce a written confession, implicating the British government.

The protagonist reflects on his predicament and admits to himself that he would actually have pulled the trigger, as revenge for the execution of his fiancée by the dictator's totalitarian régime. Constructing a makeshift slingshot, he tricks Quive-Smith into looking down the breathing hole and spears him in the head. Digging his way out, he takes Quive-Smith's identification papers, money and car. He drives to Liverpool and boards a ship for Tangier. From there, he intends to find the dictator and finish what he started.

== Development ==
Interviewed by the Radio Times for the first screening of the BBC film version of the novel, Household acknowledged that he always intended the protagonist's target to be Adolf Hitler: "Although the idea for Rogue Male germinated from my intense dislike of Hitler, I did not actually name him in the book as things were a bit tricky at the time and I thought I would leave it open so that the target could be either Hitler or Stalin. You could take your pick".

== Sequel ==
Household published a sequel, Rogue Justice, in 1982. In the sequel, the protagonist, now named as Raymond Ingelram, goes undercover in Nazi Germany, looking for a second chance to hunt the European dictator. Allied with escaping Jews and resistance groups, he fights his way across occupied Europe, with the Gestapo on his heels.

== Adaptations ==
=== Film ===
- Man Hunt, directed by Fritz Lang and starring Walter Pidgeon and George Sanders, was a 1941 Hollywood film based on Rogue Male, in which the unspecified dictator of the novel is explicitly identified as Hitler. For this version, Pidgeon's character is named Captain Alan Thorndike.
- In 2016, Fox Searchlight Pictures was setting up a new adaptation penned by Michael Lesslie (Macbeth, Assassin's Creed) and starring Benedict Cumberbatch. SunnyMarch, Cumberbatch's production company, was also producing. In November 2025, Cumberbatch said that he hoped to start filming the following year.

=== Television ===
- Rogue Male was a 1976 BBC TV film, starring Peter O'Toole, John Standing and Alastair Sim. For this version, O'Toole's character was named Sir Robert Hunter.

=== Radio ===
- In 1951, the story was adapted for American radio as a half-hour episode of the CBS anthology series Suspense. Herbert Marshall and Ben Wright starred.
- The book was adapted for radio by the BBC, on 26 December 1989, as a 90-minute drama starring Simon Cadell and David Googe. It was repeated on Radio 4 Extra on 28 February 2026.
- In 2004, an unabridged reading of Rogue Male, performed by Michael Jayston, in fifteen half-hour episodes, was broadcast on BBC Radio 7. It was broadcast again on Radio 4 Extra in August/September 2012, again in March/April 2014, again in November 2017 and most recently in March 2021. A five-part abridged reading of the sequel, Rogue Justice, was also performed by Michael Jayston. It was broadcast on BBC Radio 7 in 2009 and subsequently repeated there and on BBC Radio 4 Extra.

== Legacy ==
The book influenced David Morrell's first novel, the 1972 "hunted man" action thriller First Blood, which spawned the Rambo film series. Morrell has acknowledged the debt in several interviews, including: "When I started First Blood, back in 1968, I was deeply influenced by Geoffrey Household's Rogue Male."

The genre was spoofed by BBC Radio 4 series "Brogue Male" (1985–86) by Paul Bassett Davies and Jon G. Collee.

In 2005 Robert Macfarlane and Roger Deakin set out to find the possible location of the 'holloway' where the protagonist makes his stand in Dorset. Deakin writes of it in his posthumously published diaries Notes from Walnut Farm, and Macfarlane in his introduction to a reissue of Rogue Male and his own book Holloway (2013).

In William Gibson’s 2010 novel Zero History, protagonist Hollis Henry finds a copy of Rogue Male stacked in a birdcage in her room at the Cabinet Club in London, and continues reading it later in the story.

The book plays a part in the 2024 novel The Ministry of Time by Kaliane Bradley. The 'expat' or time traveller Lt. Graham Gore (also known as 'eighteen forty seven') reads it more than once during his training to become a twenty-first century citizen. At the end of the book Rogue Male appears as a token of the love between the two main characters.

== See also ==
- Operation Foxley, a real-life, never-attempted SOE plan to assassinate Hitler
- List of assassinations in fiction
