= Operation Foxley =

Proposed British operation to assassinate Adolf Hitler

Operation Foxley was a British Special Operations Executive (SOE) plan to assassinate Adolf Hitler in 1944. At the height of World War II, one option to swiftly end the war was killing Hitler in a decapitation strike. The SOE developed two potential assassination modules, one was to poison, and the other, shooting with a special gun. Although detailed preparations were made, no attempt was made to carry out the plan. The secret document, a 20-page dossier, was declassified in July 1998 by the British Public Record Office following the 30-year confidentiality limit.

== Prior plans ==
At the start of World War II in 1939, British secret services had thought of drawing up assassination plans against Hitler. However, the propositions were never unequivocally initiated. Winston Churchill became the British Prime Minister in 1940, and had keen interest in military tactics. In 1941 he authorised the hatching of plots to assassinate Nazi leaders. In one of the most successful high-ranking assassinations, name Operation Anthropoid, Czech soldiers, Jozef Gabčík and Jan Kubiš ambushed Reinhard Heydrich, chief of the Reich Security Main Office (including the Gestapo, Kripo, and SD) on 27 May 1942. Heydrich died of his injuries on 4 June. Training and planning for the operatives were done by SOE. One of the first actual British plans to assassinate Hitler was to bomb his special train Amerika (in 1943 renamed Brandenburg) – the SOE had extensive experience of derailing trains using explosives. The plan was dropped because Hitler's schedule was too irregular and unpredictable: stations were informed of his arrival only a few minutes beforehand.

== Background ==
In June 1944, an anonymous informer tipped off the SOE office in Algiers, North Africa: there would be an opportunity to kill Hitler as he was to visit a chateau in Perpignan, southern France. Although the SOE did not act on the suggestion, the message inspired Major General Colin Gubbins, head of the SOE, to devise a more surreptitious plan.

== Plan ==
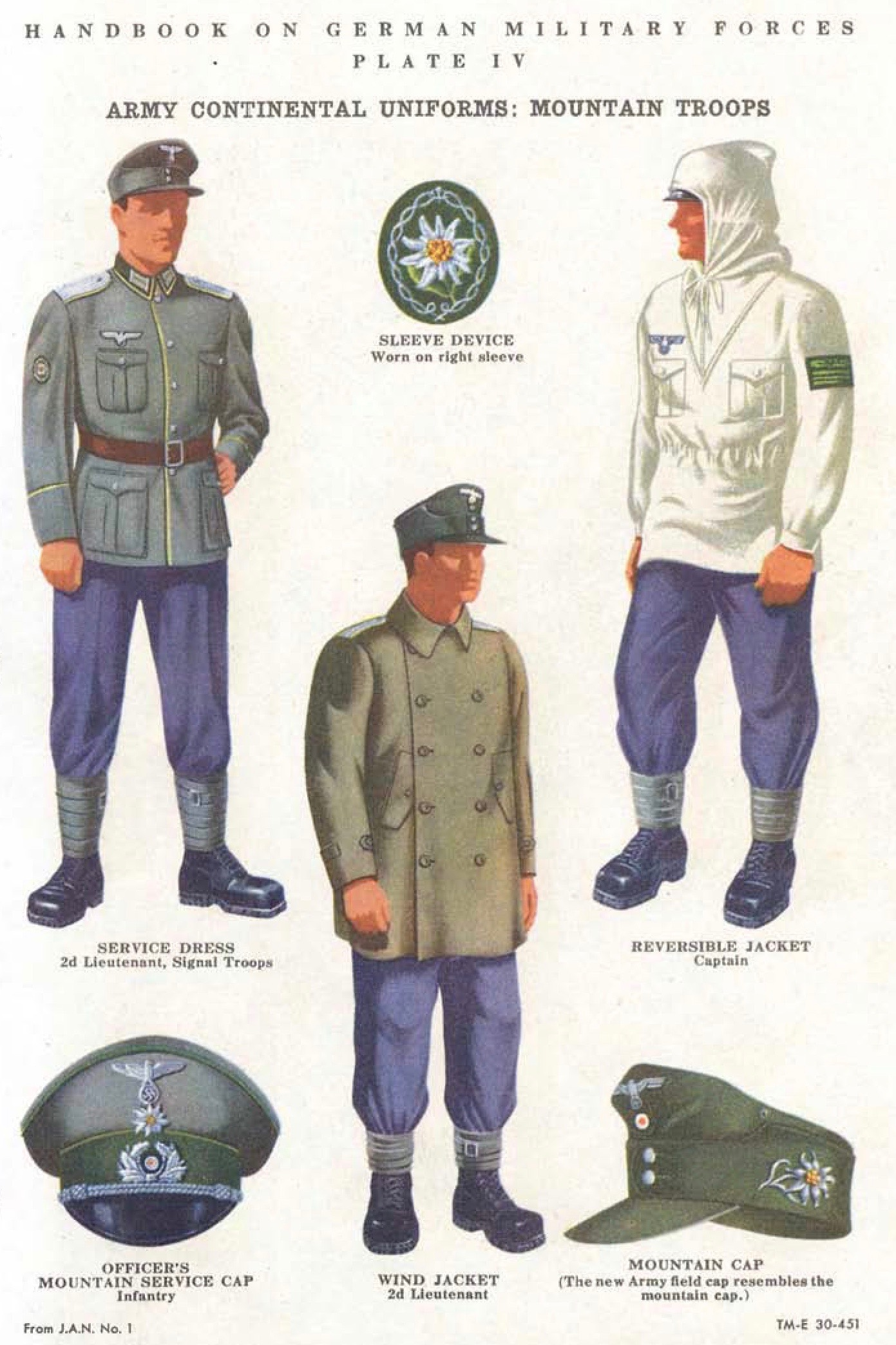
Uniform of Gebirgsjäger (German mountain troops); the assassins would be disguised in dress like this.

Ultimately a sniper attack was considered to be the method most likely to succeed. In the summer of 1944, a German who had been part of Hitler's personal guard at the Berghof had been taken prisoner in Normandy. He revealed that at the Berghof, Hitler always took a 20-minute morning walk at around the same time (after 10:00). Hitler liked to be left alone during this walk, leaving him unprotected near some woods, where he was out of sight of sentry posts. When Hitler was at the Berghof, a Nazi flag visible from a cafe in the nearby town was flown.

The plan was to assassinate Hitler during his morning exercise, as he walked unprotected to the Teehaus on Mooslahnerkopf Hill from the Berghof residence. The scheme called for the SOE to parachute a German-speaking Pole and a British sniper into Austria. An "inside man" was recruited, the uncle of a prisoner of war named Dieser, who was a shopkeeper living in nearby (20 km) Salzburg, identified as "Heidentaler", who was vehemently anti-Nazi. Heidentaler would shelter the agents and transport them to Berchtesgaden disguised as German mountain troops (Gebirgsjäger), from where they would make the approach to the vantage point for the attack.

A sniper was recruited and briefed, and the plan was submitted. The sniper practised by firing at moving dummy targets with a specially enhanced Kar 98k with a Mauser telescopic sight, the standard rifle of the Wehrmacht, under conditions that simulated the planned attack. Additionally, a 9mm parabellum Luger pistol fitted with a British-made silencer was provided so that the sniper could quietly deal with any threats while approaching the target. The Luger is now on display at the Combined Military Services Museum in Maldon, Essex.

Another plan was to put some tasteless but lethal poison in the drinking water supply on Hitler's train. However, this plan was considered too complicated because of the need for an inside man.

There was some opposition to the assassination plan among the British authorities, particularly from the Deputy Head of SOE's German Directorate, Lt. Col. Ronald Thornley. However, his superior, Sir Gerald Templer, & British Prime Minister Winston Churchill supported it.

The plan came too late. Hitler left the Berghof for the last time on 14 July 1944, never to return. Six days later, anti-Nazi Wehrmacht officers attempted to assassinate him as part of the 20 July plot.

== See also ==
- Assassination attempts on Adolf Hitler
- Rogue Male, a prewar novel about a British private citizen making such an assassination attempt prior to the start of World War II
- Killing Hitler, a BBC docudrama
- Inglourious Basterds
- The Day of the Jackal
- Bombing of Obersalzberg
