= Großer Hafner =

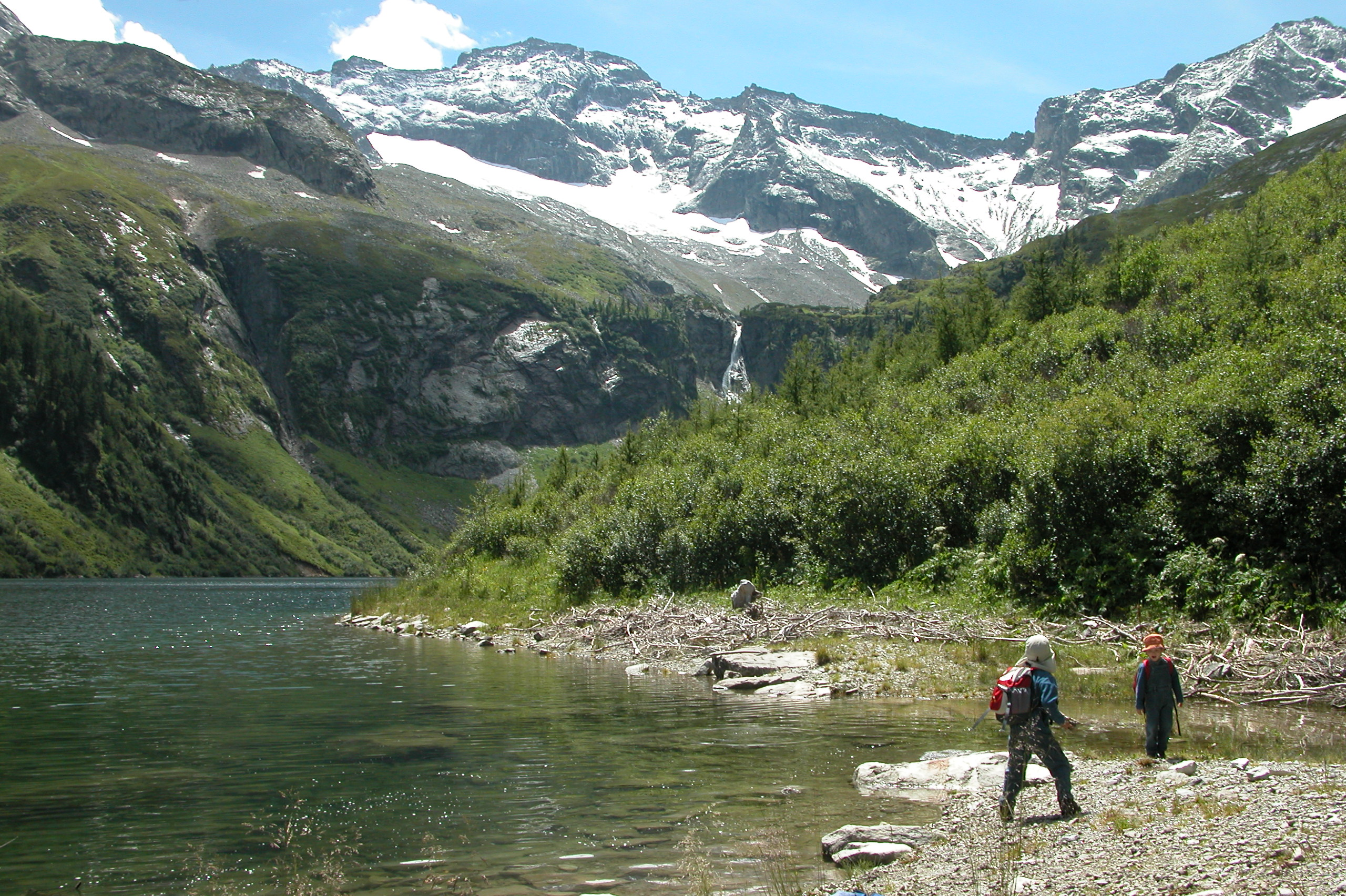
- Großer Hafner massif, view from Rotgülden Lake in the northeast

Highest point
- Elevation: 3,076 m (10,092 ft)
- Prominence: 824 m (2,703 ft)
- Listing: Alpine mountains above 3000 m
- Coordinates: 47°04′12″N 13°24′01″E

Geography
- Location within Alps
- Location: Austria
- Parent range: Ankogel Group; High Tauern

Großer Hafner is a 3,076 m (10,092 ft) high partly-glaciated mountain of the Ankogel Group in the High Tauern range, located at the border between the Austrian states of Carinthia and Salzburg. It is the easternmost three-thousander peak (with at least 300 m (980 ft) prominence) of the range, and also in the entire Alps.

== Geography ==
The Hafner massif rises between the Radstadt Tauern and the Mur valley of the Salzburg Lungau region in the north and the Carinthian Malta valley in the south. It comprises Kleiner Hafner (3,018 m (9,902 ft)) and Großer Sonnblick (3,030 m (9,940 ft)) subpeaks, lying just to the southeast. In the south, the Malta valley leads to the Reißeck Group, while in the east, Katschberg Pass separates it from the neighbouring Gurktal Alps.

The Hafner summit marks the eastern rim of the geological Hohe Tauern window. It has three glaciers, with the largest on its north face, and also comprises numerous Alpine lakes. The high mountain region, formerly a mining area, recently has become a centre of hydropower economy, most notably the Kölnbrein Dam in the southwest.

== Ascent ==
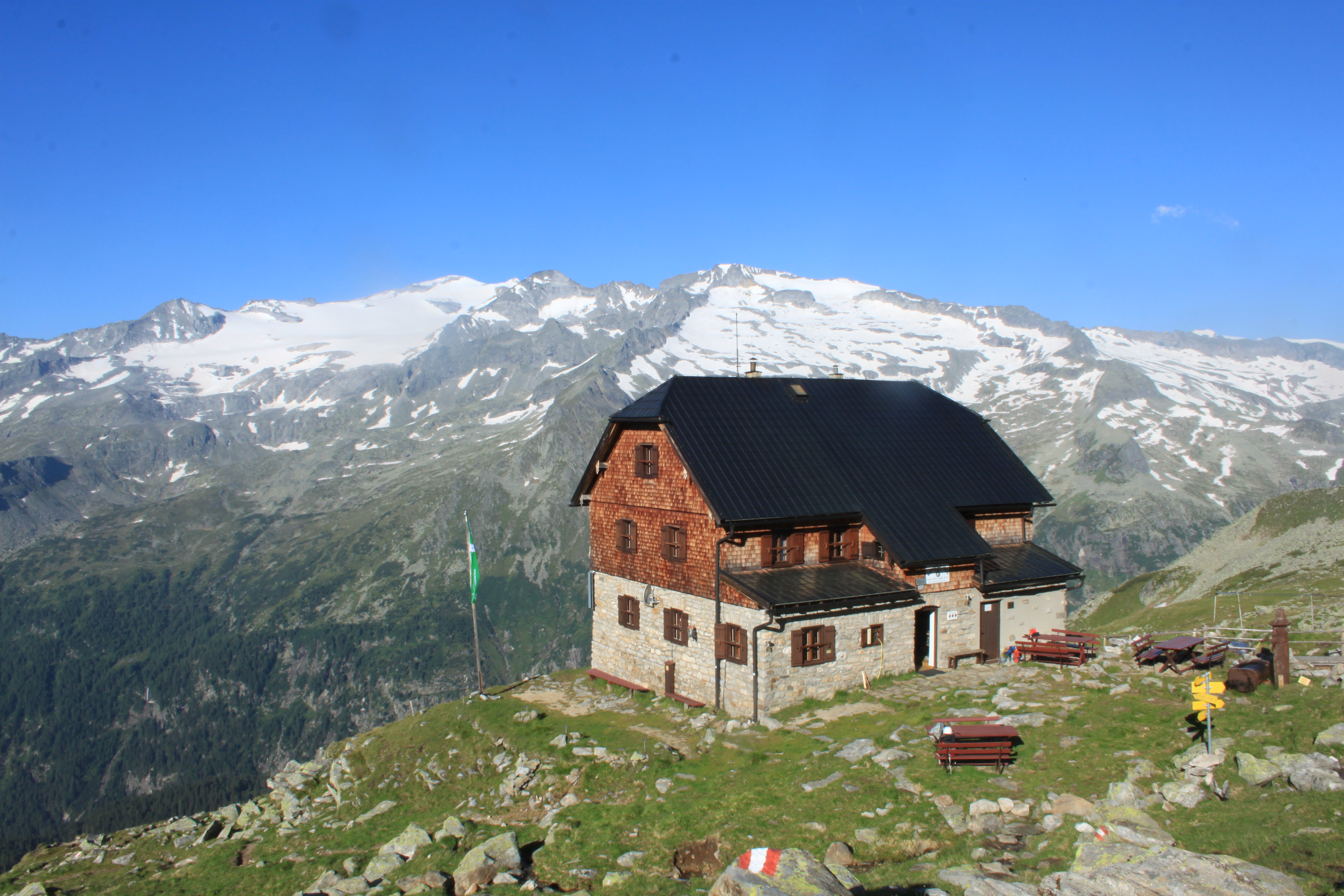
Kattowitzer Hütte, view to Hochalmspitze

The mountain is not a particularly hard climb. Most trails start from the Malta valley via Kölnbrein Dam. An Alpine club hut (Kattowitzer Hütte) is located on the southern Ochsenkar slope, at an altitude of (2,320 m (7,610 ft)). The eastern ascent from Rennweg am Katschberg is even easier, but with about 15 kilometres (9.3 mi) quite long.
