= Malta, Austria =

Malta
- Municipality
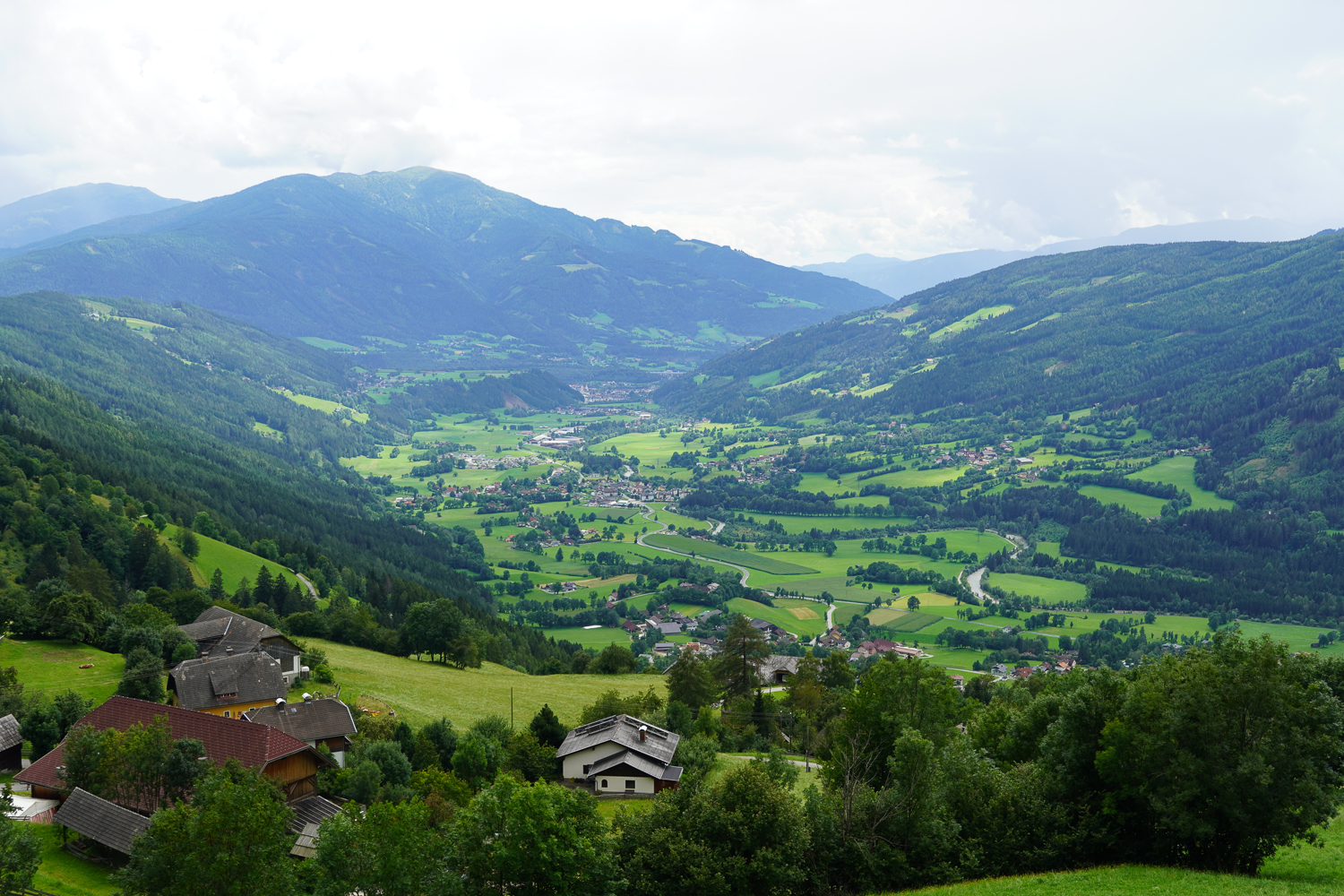

- Coat of arms

- Location within Austria
- Coordinates: 46°58′N 13°31′E
- Country: Austria
- State: Carinthia
- District: Spittal an der Drau

Government
  - Mayor: Klaus Rüscher

Area
  - Total: 261.92 km^{2} (101.13 sq mi)
- Elevation: 843 m (2,766 ft)

Population (2018-01-01)
  - Total: 1,986
  - Density: 7.582/km^{2} (19.64/sq mi)
- Time zone: UTC+1 (CET)
  - Summer (DST): UTC+2 (CEST)
- Postal code: 9854
- Area code: 04733

Malta is a municipality and a village in the district of Spittal an der Drau, in the Austrian state of Carinthia.

== Geography ==
The municipal area, with 262 square kilometres (101 mi^{2}) the second largest in Carinthia, covers most of the Maltatal valley, stretching from the Ankogel Group of the Hohe Tauern range in the northwest down to the town of Gmünd on the Lieser river, a tributary of the Drava. In the southwest it borders on the Reißeck municipality, while the Alpine crest including the Ankogel and Hochalmspitze peaks forms the northern border with the Austrian state of Salzburg. It includes the cadastral communities (Katastralgemeinden) of Dornbach, Malta proper, and Maltaberg.

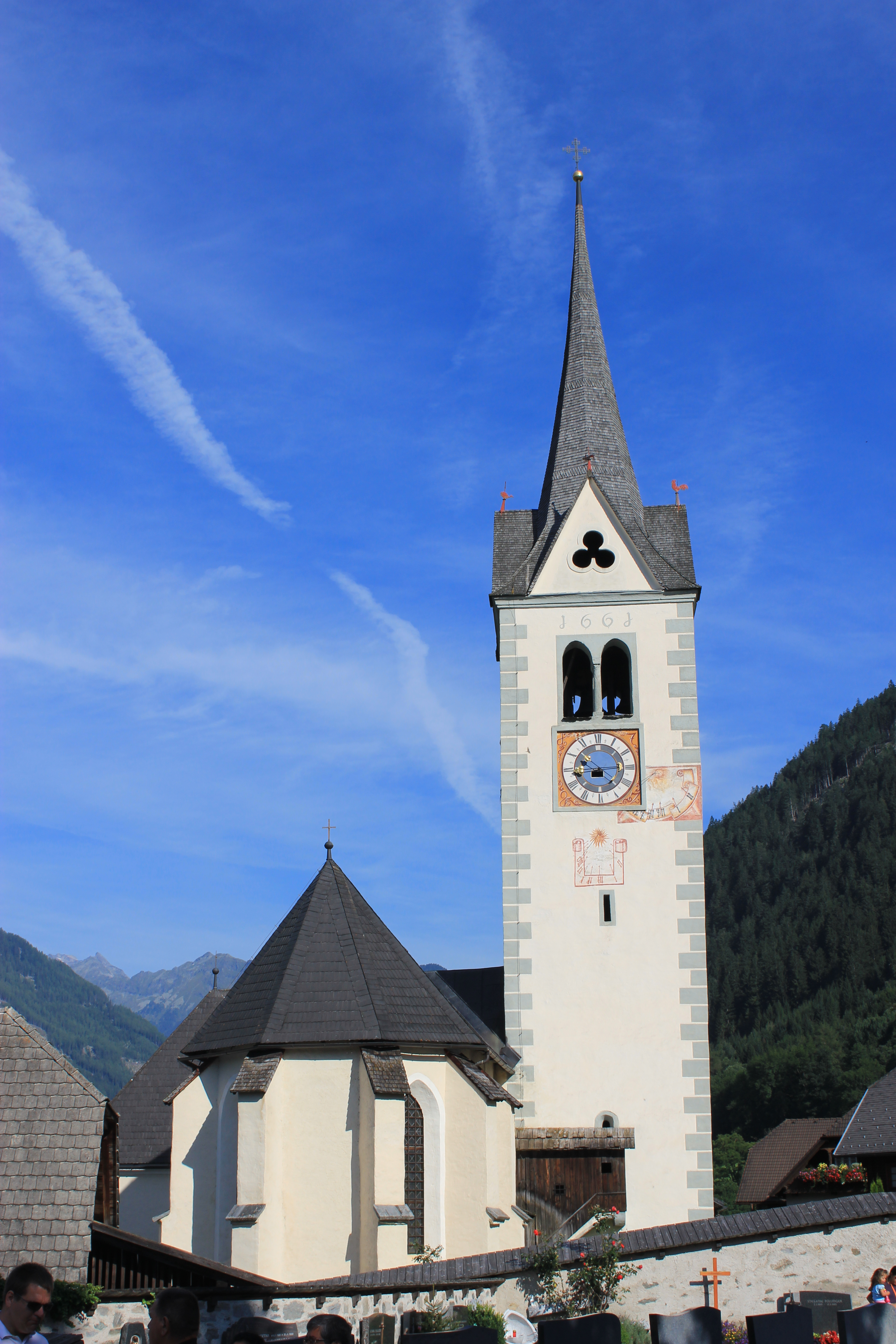
Parish church

Formerly an agricultural area, the local economy today largely depends on tourism with about 120,000 overnight stays per year. Attractions include a former provost's cottage (turned into an open-air museum) and the Fallbach Klettersteig, a via ferrata along the Fallbach Waterfall. In 1987 the Nationalpark Hohe Tauern was extended as far as the Ankogel Group and today, some 85.7 square kilometres of the municipal area are part of the national park territory.

== History ==
Already settled in pre-Roman times, the first documented mention of Malta was between 957 and 992 under the name locus Malontina. In the 11th century, Ödenfest Castle was erected on the northern slopes of the Maltatal valley, then held by ministeriales of the Bishops of Brixen. It was devastated in the early 14th century, when the local Counts of Malta revolted against the Meinhardiner dukes of Carinthia.

A first church beneath the castle was mentioned between 1006 and 1039. The Gothic parish church of Maria Hilf Assumptio was built in various stages between the 13th and the 15th centuries. It has a Roman gravestone set into the wall, 15th-century paintings in the vaults, and 14th-century frescoes on the walls of the choir. In the neighbourhood is the Dornbach water castle (originally Gothic, but with alterations added in the 16th century); it is surrounded by a circuit of walls and a moat. The village of Fischertratten is centered on a Protestant church, erected upon the Patent of Toleration in 1787.

== Kölnbrein Dam ==
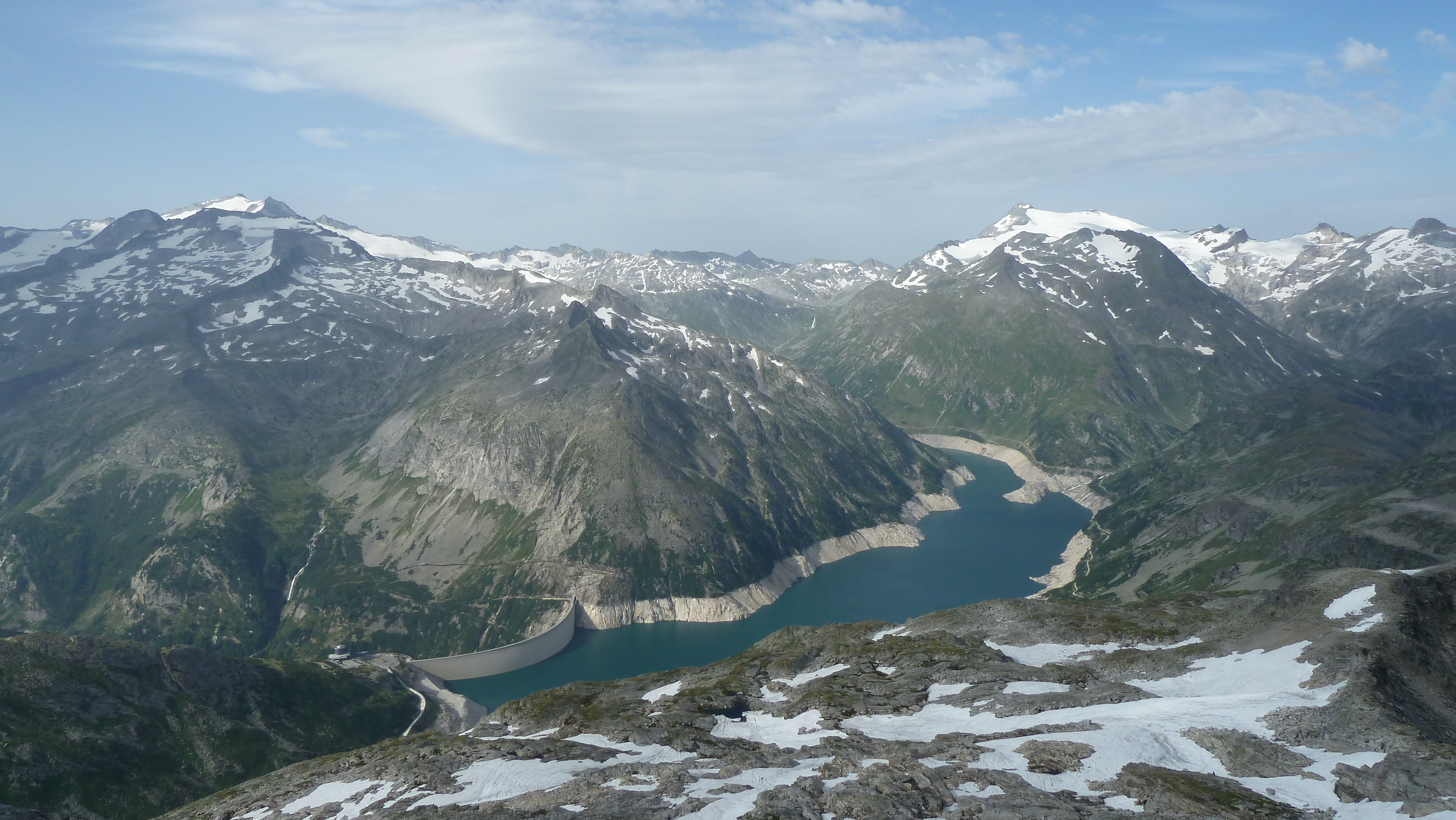
Kölnbrein reservoir with Hochalmspitze and Ankogel peaks

The Hochalm mountain road up the steep Malta valley leads to the Kölnbrein arch dam, part of the Malta hydroelectric plant run by the Verbund power company. Tunnels lead the water to the power stations in the Möll valley at Reißeck over 1100 m (3610 ft) below.

The dam collects a large amount of water from the surrounding mountains and also by a system of water supply tunnels bringing water from the Lieser and Möll rivers. Built between 1971 and 1978 with a length of 626 m (2053 ft), it reaches a height above ground of 200 m (656 ft) and is the tallest in Austria. The reservoir extends 4.5 km (2.8 mi) behind the dam, holding approximately 200 million m³ of water.

Adjacent to the dam is a restaurant and a hotel. The reservoir serves competitive rowers for altitude training while the dam is a popular bungee jumping venue.

== Politics ==
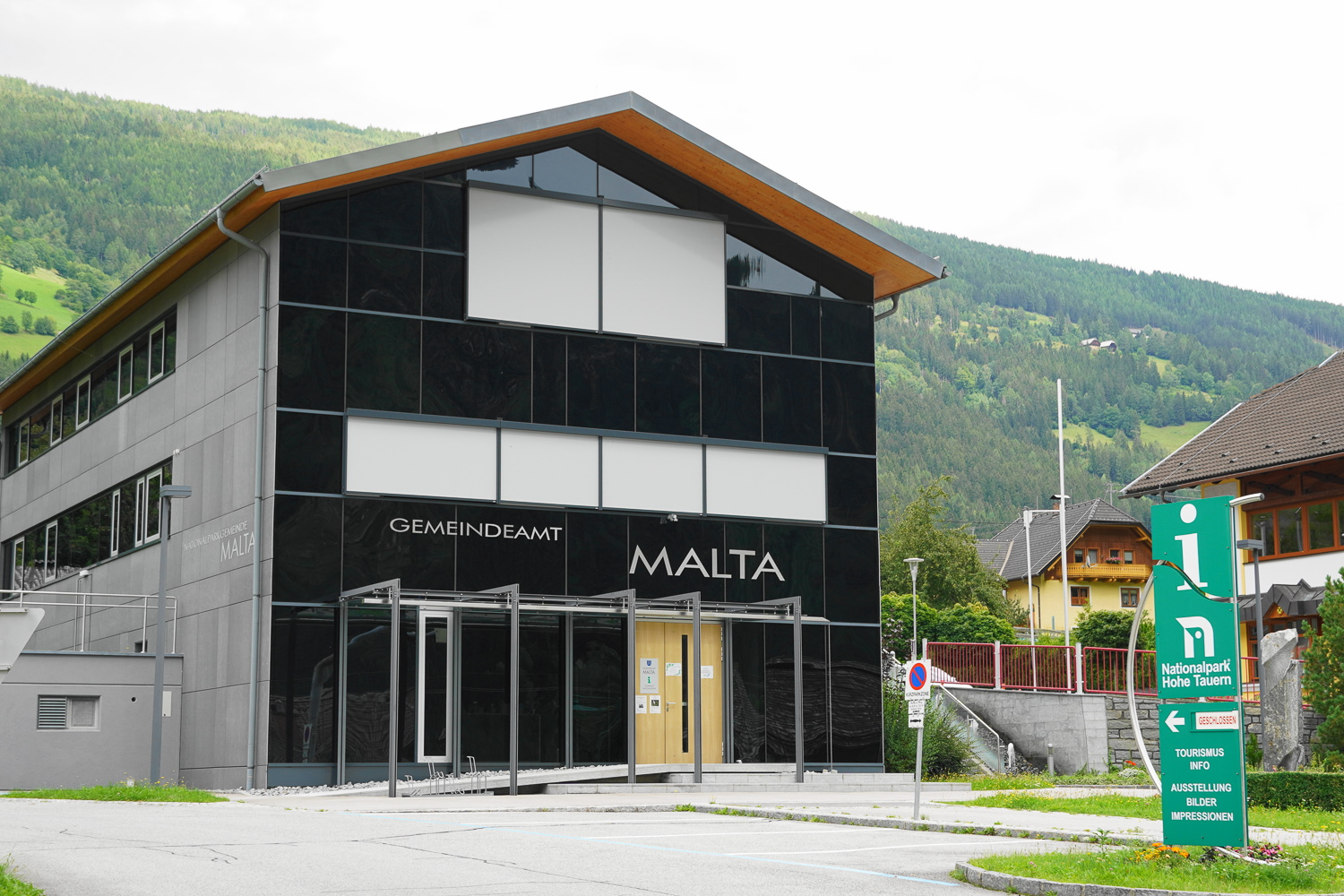
Municipal office

Seats in the municipal assembly (Gemeinderat) as of 2015 local elections:

- Liste für Malta (Independent): 6
- Freedom Party of Austria (FPÖ): 5
- Social Democratic Party of Austria (SPÖ): 4
- Greens and Independents: 4

== Notable people ==
- Eva Kary, called Faschaunerin, tortured and executed in 1773
