= Ankogel Group =

Sub-group of the Central Eastern Alps

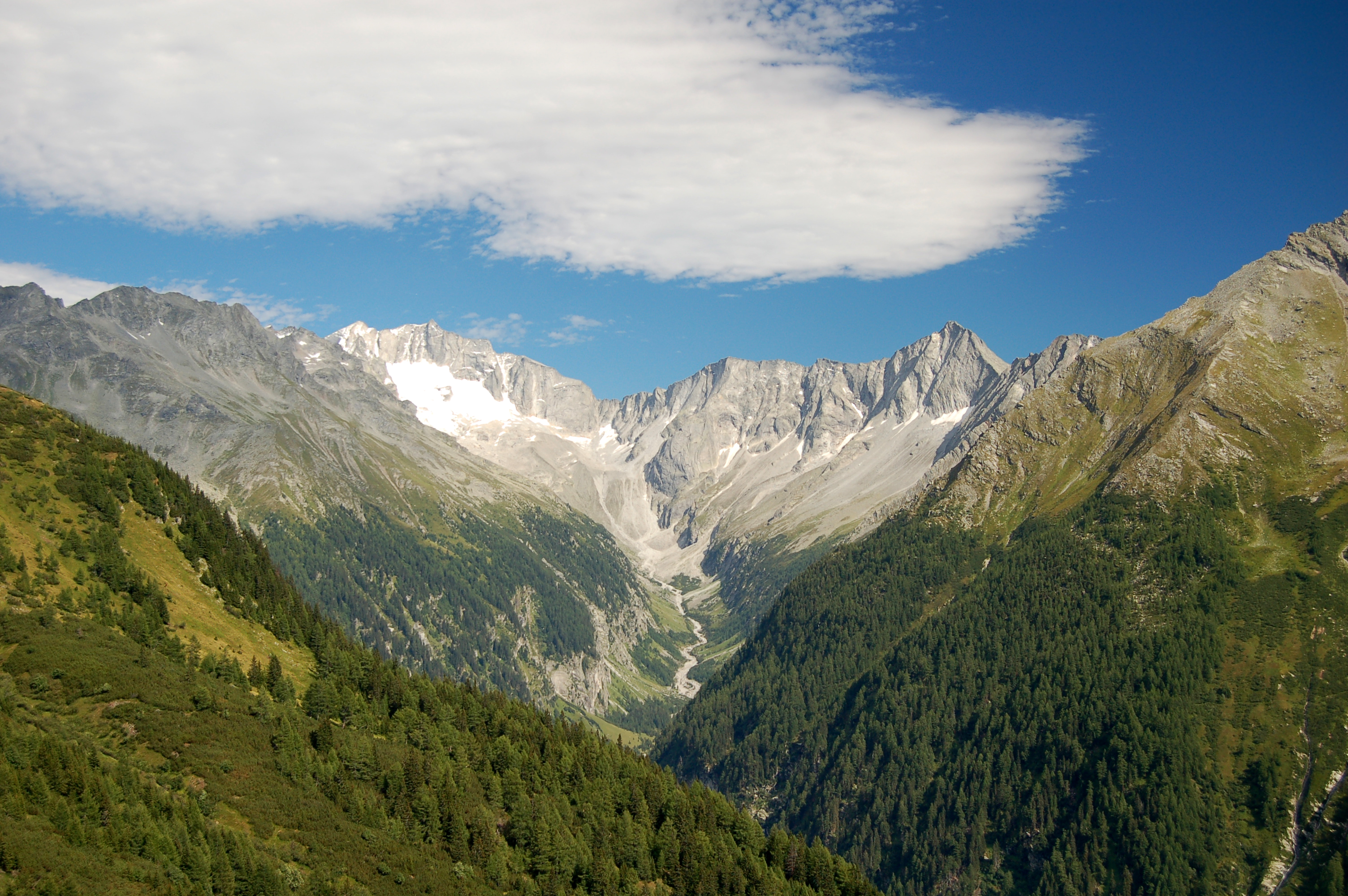
- Seebach Valley near Mallnitz with Hochalmspitze

Highest point
- Peak: Hochalmspitze
- Elevation: 3,360 m above sea level (AA)

Geography
- Location within Alps
- Country: Austria
- States: Carinthia and Salzburg
- Range coordinates: 47°00′57″N 13°19′17″E
- Parent range: Western Tauern Alps; Hohe Tauern

The Ankogel Group (German: Ankogelgruppe) is a sub-group of the Central Eastern Alps. Together with the Goldberg Group, the Glockner Group, the Schober Group, the Kreuzeck Group, the Granatspitze Group, the Venediger Group, the Villgraten Mountains and the Rieserferner Group it forms the mountain range of the Hohe Tauern (High Tauern).

The Ankogel Group is located in the Austrian federal states of Salzburg and Carinthia. Its highest peak is the Hochalmspitze, 3,360 m (AA) (11,020 ft).

== Geography ==
The Ankogel Group is the easternmost mountain group of the High Tauern and lies on the main chain of the Alps. The Lower Tauern begin further east. The range gets its name from the Ankogel mountain. 3,252 m (10,669 ft).

The Ankogel Group can be further divided into the sub-groups of the Ankogel Massif, the Hochalmspitze Group, the Hafner Group and the Reißeck Group south of the Möll Valley. It comprises the picturesque Maltatal ("valley of falling waters") with the Fallbach Waterfall and the Kölnbrein Dam.

=== Neighbouring ranges ===
The Ankogel Group borders on the following other mountain ranges in the Eastern Alps:

- Goldberg Group (in the West)
- Kreuzeck Group (in the southwest)

(both also part of the High Tauern)

- Salzburg Slate Alps, lying north of the Salzach River
- Radstädter Tauern, lying northeast of the Mur River
- Nock Mountains, lying beyond the Lieser Valley in the east.
- Gailtal Alps, south of the Drava,

part of the Southern Limestone Alps.

== Peaks ==
All the named three-thousands in the Ankogel Group:

- Hochalmspitze 3,360 m above sea level (AA)
- Großelendkopf 3,317 m above sea level (AA)
- Großer Ankogel 3,252 m above sea level (AA)
- Jochspitze 3,179 m above sea level (AA)
- Schwarzkopf 3,171 m above sea level (AA)
- Zsigmondyspitze 3,152 m above sea level (AA)
- Preimlspitz 3,133 m above sea level (AA)
- Steinerne Mandln 3,125 m above sea level (AA)
- Winkelspitz 3,112 m above sea level (AA)
- Oberlercherspitze 3,107 m above sea level (AA)
- Kordonspitze 3,102 m above sea level (AA)
- Kleiner Ankogel 3,096 m above sea level (AA)
- Säuleck 3,086 m above sea level (AA)
- Großer Hafner 3,076 m above sea level (AA)
- Elendköpfe 3,070 m above sea level (AA)
- Großer Sonnblick 3,030 m above sea level (AA)
- Lanischeck 3,024 m above sea level (AA)
- Kleiner Hafner 3,018 m above sea level (AA)
- Schneewinkelspitze 3,016 m above sea level (AA)
- Tischlerkarkopf 3,004 m above sea level (AA)
- Tischlerspitze 3,002 m above sea level (AA)
- Grubenkarkopf 3,001 m above sea level (AA)
- Mittlerer Sonnblick 3,000 m above sea level (AA)
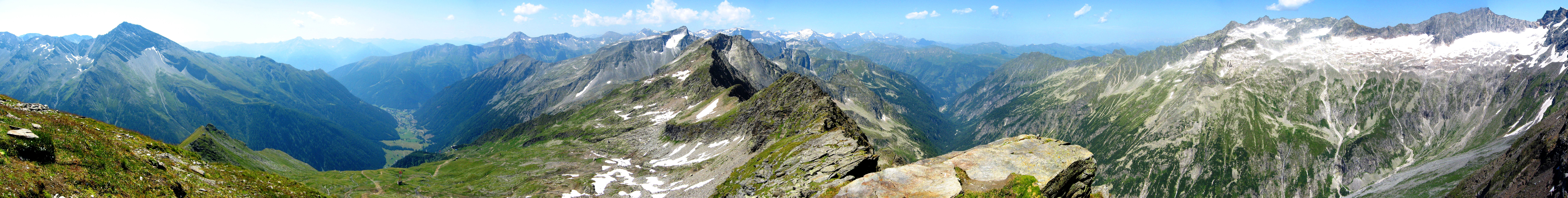
Panorama view from near top station of Ankogel cable car on Arnoldhöhe, ca. 2700 m

== Sources ==
- Liselotte Buchenauer, Peter Holl: Alpenvereinsführer Ankogel- und Goldberggruppe. Bergverlag Rudolf Rother, Munich, 1986. ISBN 3-7633-1247-1
