= Joseph von Sonnenfels =

Austrian noble

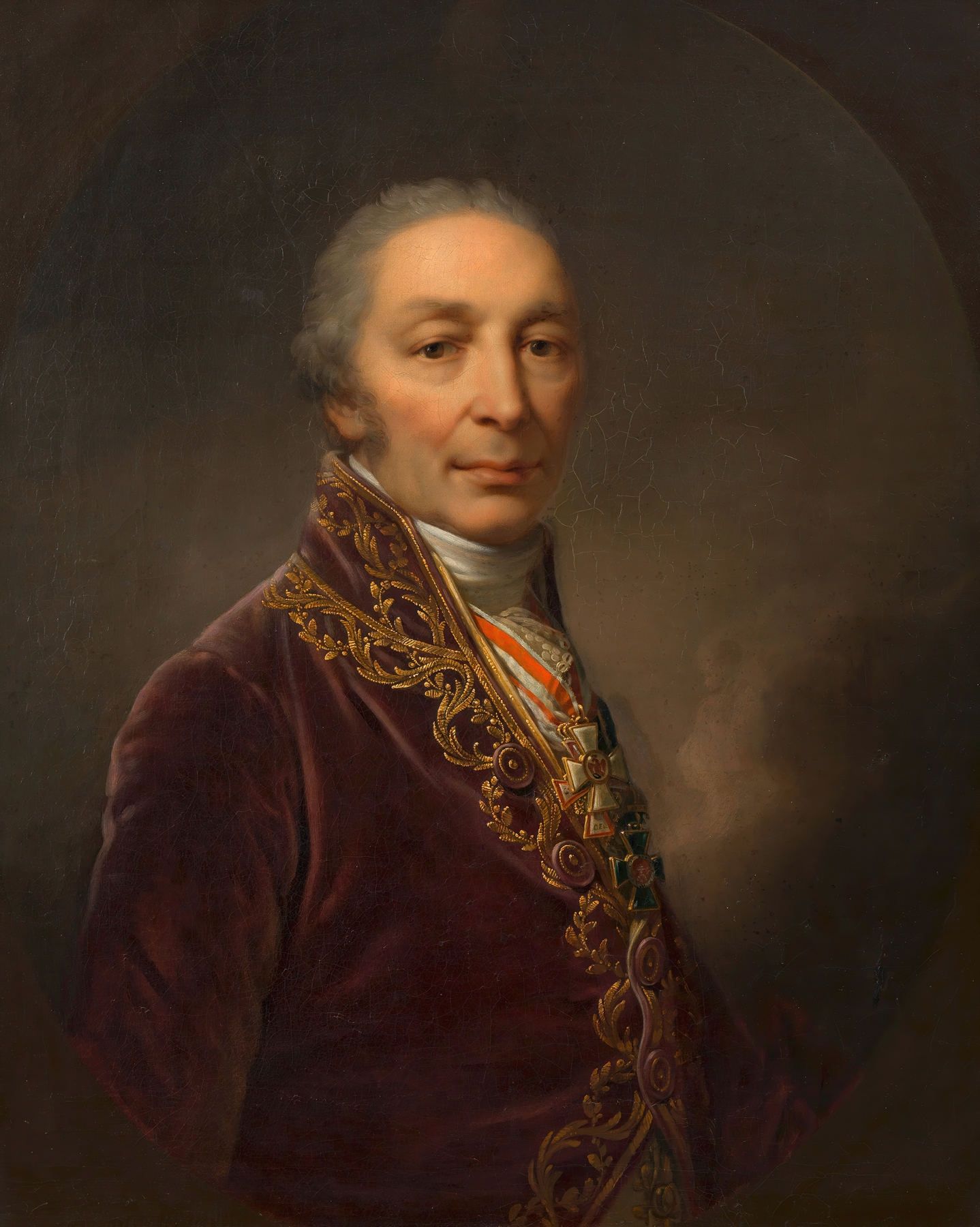
Portrait painting of von Sonnenfels by Johann Baptist von Lampi the Younger

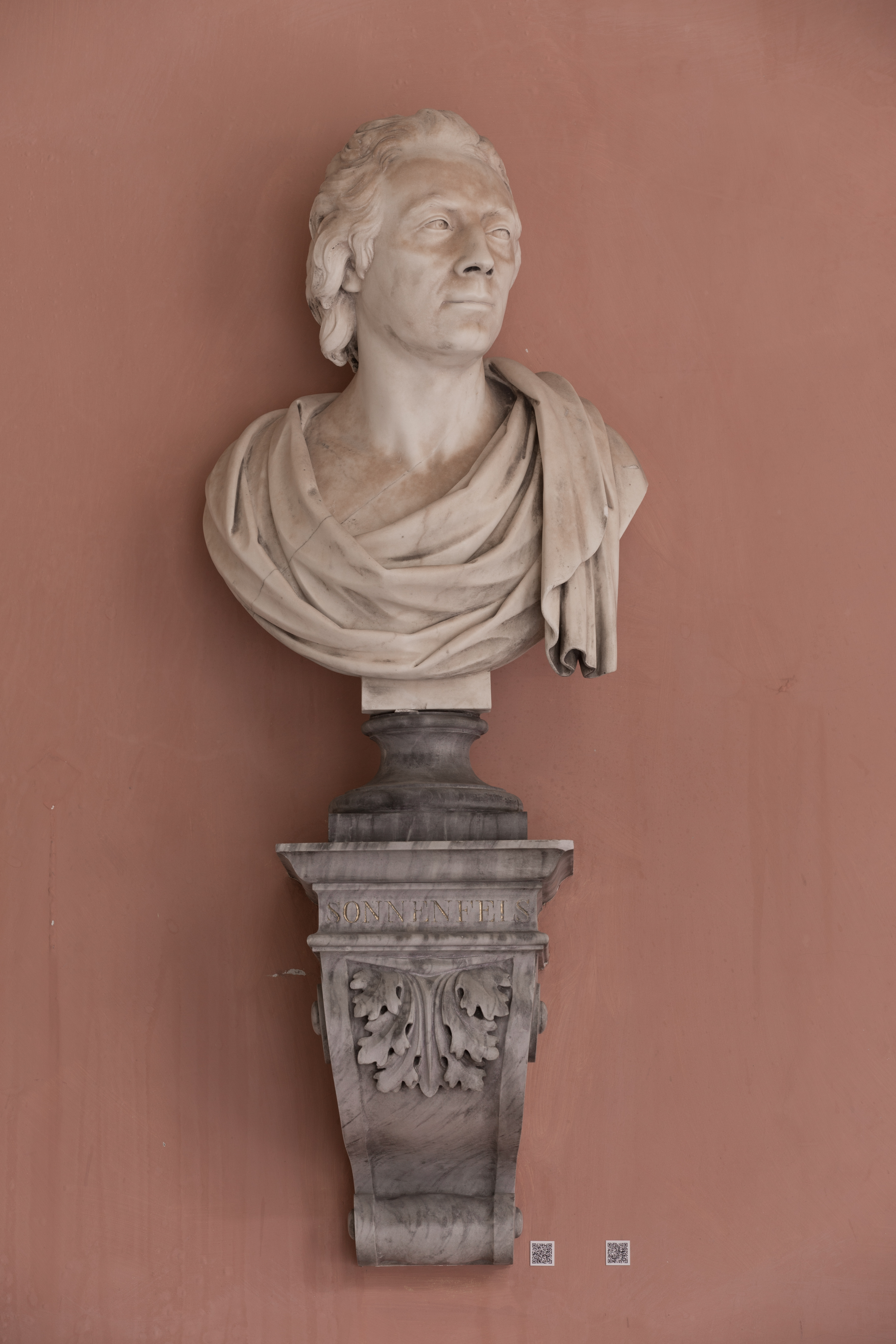
Josef von Sonnenfels's bust in the University of Vienna

Joseph Freiherr von Sonnenfels (1733 – 25 April 1817) was an Austrian and German jurist and novelist and counsellor of state. He played a key role in Enlightenment in Austria, was among the leaders of the Illuminati movement in the country, and a close friend and patron of Mozart. He is also the dedicatee of Ludwig van Beethoven's Piano Sonata No. 15, Op. 28, which was published in 1801.

== Life ==
He was born in Nikolsburg/Mikulov, Moravia, a son of Perlin Lipmann (1705–1768), himself a son of the chief rabbi of Brandenburg. Perlin Lipmann and his children converted to Catholicism some time between 1735 and 1741. Joseph, who was baptized in his early youth, received his elementary education at the gymnasium of his native town Nikolsburg, and then studied philosophy at the University of Vienna. In 1749, he joined the Deutschmeister regiment as a private, advancing to the rank of corporal. On his discharge in 1754, he took a course in law at the University of Vienna and established himself as a counselor at law in the Austrian capital. From 1761 to 1763, he officiated as secretary of the Austrian Arcierengarde. In 1763, he was appointed professor of political science at the University of Vienna, twice acting as rector magnificus. In 1779, he received the title of Wirklicher Hofrath, and was in 1810 elected president of the Academy of Sciences, a position which he held until his death in Vienna.

From 1765 to 1767 and from 1769 to 1775 Sonnenfels was editor of the paper Der Mann ohne Vorurtheil, in which he defended the liberal tendencies in literature. He improved the Vienna stage especially through his critical work Briefe über die Wienerische Schaubühne, in which he attacked the harlequin of the Vienna theater, causing this figure to be eliminated from the personnel of the stage.

He was an advisor to Maria Theresa and was chiefly instrumental in bringing about the abolition of torture in Austria (1776), through calling attention to the case of Eva Faschaunerin.

Sonnenfels' attitude toward Lessing placed the former in a very unfavorable light, as it was due to his intrigues and jealousy that Lessing was not called to Vienna. Sonnenfels was severely condemned for his action in this affair. In 1817, Sonnenfels was elected a member of the American Philosophical Society in Philadelphia.

Sonnenfels was an influential party in the debate over which written standard should become dominant and his backing of Gottsched's position, thereby subverting the local "Gemeindeutsch" standard and Popowitsch's compromise standard alike. He is considered as a "Key stakeholders of the Austrian elite [... who was] impressed with the East Central German standard and Sonnenfels would influence with his “taste reform the literary developments in a role as ‘Austrian Gottsched’ ” in Vienna (De Boor & Newald, 1967, p. VI/1:403)."

Sonnenfels was also influential in the development of police studies; his Grundsätze der Polizey, Handlung und Finanz (Principles of Police, Action and Finance-1765, 1769, 1776) defined police as responsible for maintaining state population and internal security and distinguished between public security and individual relations. His idea of policing covered a wide swathe of state functions, from population growth to welfare to education to security. Grundsätze der Polizey work served as a university manual and influenced police thinking across the Habsburg Empire.

Through his work On Business Style he made notable contribution to the conceptualisation of Austrian bureaucracy.

== Works ==
- Specimen Juris Germanici de Remediis Juris, Juri Romano Incognitis, Vienna, 1757.
- Ankündigung einer Teutschen Gesellschaft in Wien, Vienna 1761.
- Betrachtungen über die neun politischen Handlungsgrundsätze der Engländer (in German). Wien: Georg Ludwig Schulz. 1764.
- Grundsätze der Polizei, Handlung und Finanzwissenschaft, Vienna 1765–67 (8th ed. 1819).
  - Sätze aus der Polizei, Handlungs- und Finanz-Wissenschaft (in German). Vol. 1. Wien: Johann Thomas von Trattner. 1765.
  - Grundsätze der Polizei-Handlung und Finanz (in German). Tübingen: Christian Friedrich Osiander. 1820.
- Briefe über die Wienerische Schaubühne, Vienna 1768 (reedited by Sauer, Vienna 1884).
- Von der Verwandlung der Domänen in Bauerngüter, Vienna 1773.
- Über die Abschaffung der Tortur (in German). Zurich. 1775.
  - Su l'abolizione della tortura (in Italian). Milano: Giuseppe Galeazzi. 1776.
  - Über die Abschaffung der Tortur (in German) (2 ed.). Wien und Nürnberg: C. Weigel & Adam Gottlieb Schneider. 1782.
- Gründet sich das Recht der Monarchen mit dem Tode zu straffen in der Uebertragung der Menschen (in German). Wien: Grund. 1780.
- Erste Vorlesung in diesem akademischen Jahrgange (in German). Wien: Joseph von Kurzbeck. 1782.
- Abhandlung über die Aufhebung der Wuchergesetze, Vienna, 1791.
- Riflessioni d'un patriotta austriaco ad un amico (in Italian). Wien: Mathias Andreas Schmidt. 1793.
- Handbuch der inneren Staatsverwaltung mit Rücksicht aus die Umstände und Begriff der Zeit (in German). Wien: Joseph Camesina & C. 1798.
- Ueber die Stimmenmehrheit bei Criminalurtheilen, Vienna, 1801.
  - Über die Stimmenmehrheit bei Kriminal-Urtheilen (in German) (2 ed.). Wien: Camesina. 1808.

His Gesammelte Werke appeared in 10 volumes (Vienna, 1783–87), and contained most of his belletristic works, poems, and dramas.

University of Vienna honoured him in 1998 by naming one of the "Gates of Remembrance" on its campus after him(Sonnenfels Gate, main entrance Alser Straße 4).

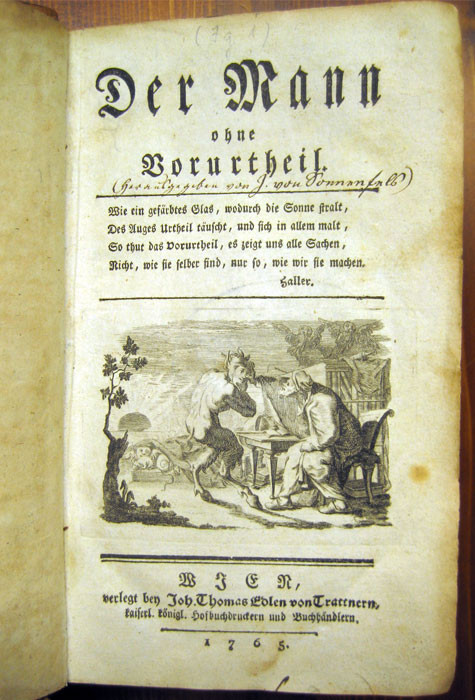
Der Mann ohne Vorurtheil, 1765

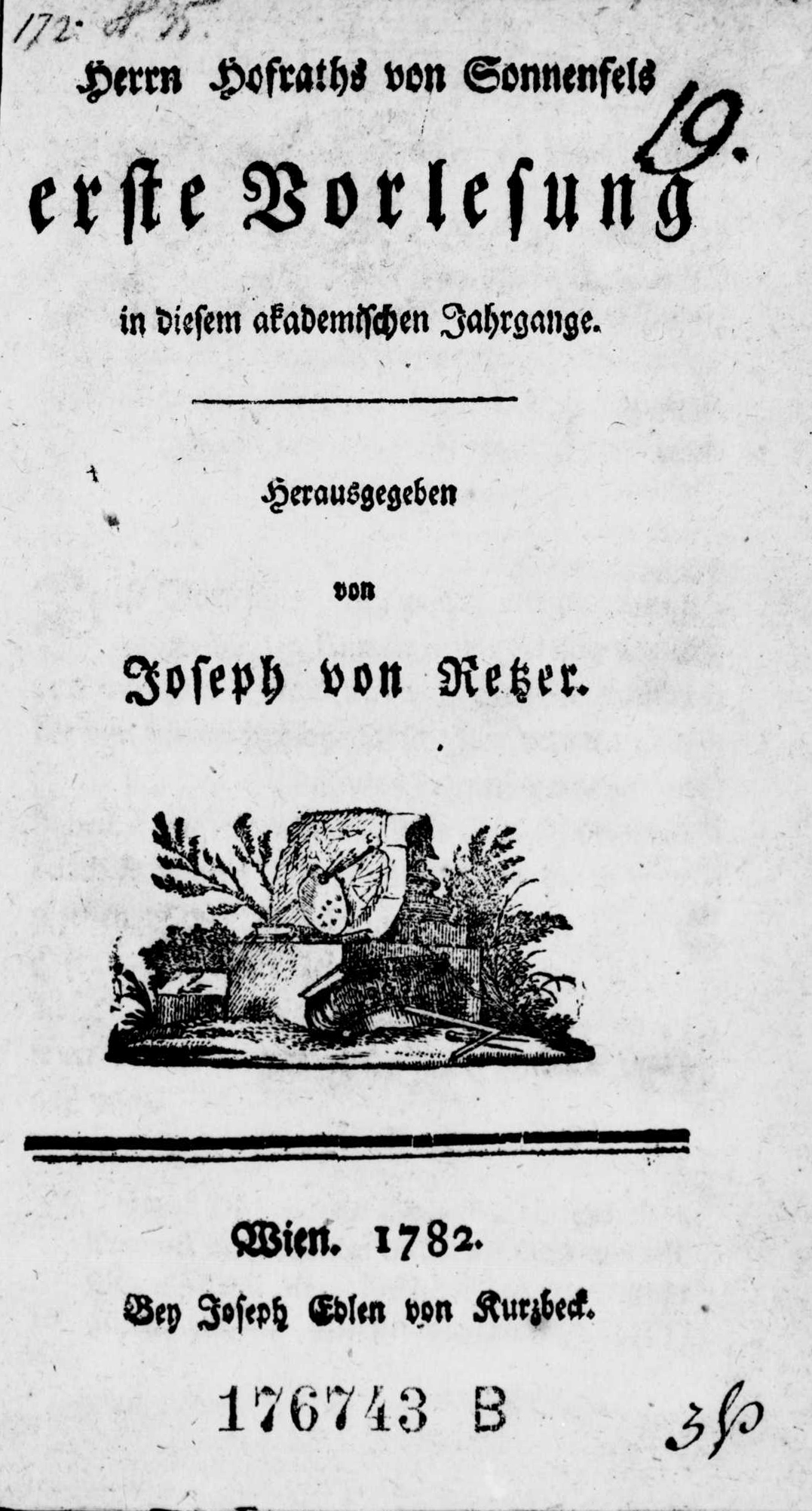
Erste Vorlesung in diesem akademischen Jahrgange, 1782

== Sources ==
- The Masonic Thread of Mozart by Katherine Thomson (page 16). Published in London 1977.
