= Nicolai Užnik =

Austrian rock climber (born 2000)

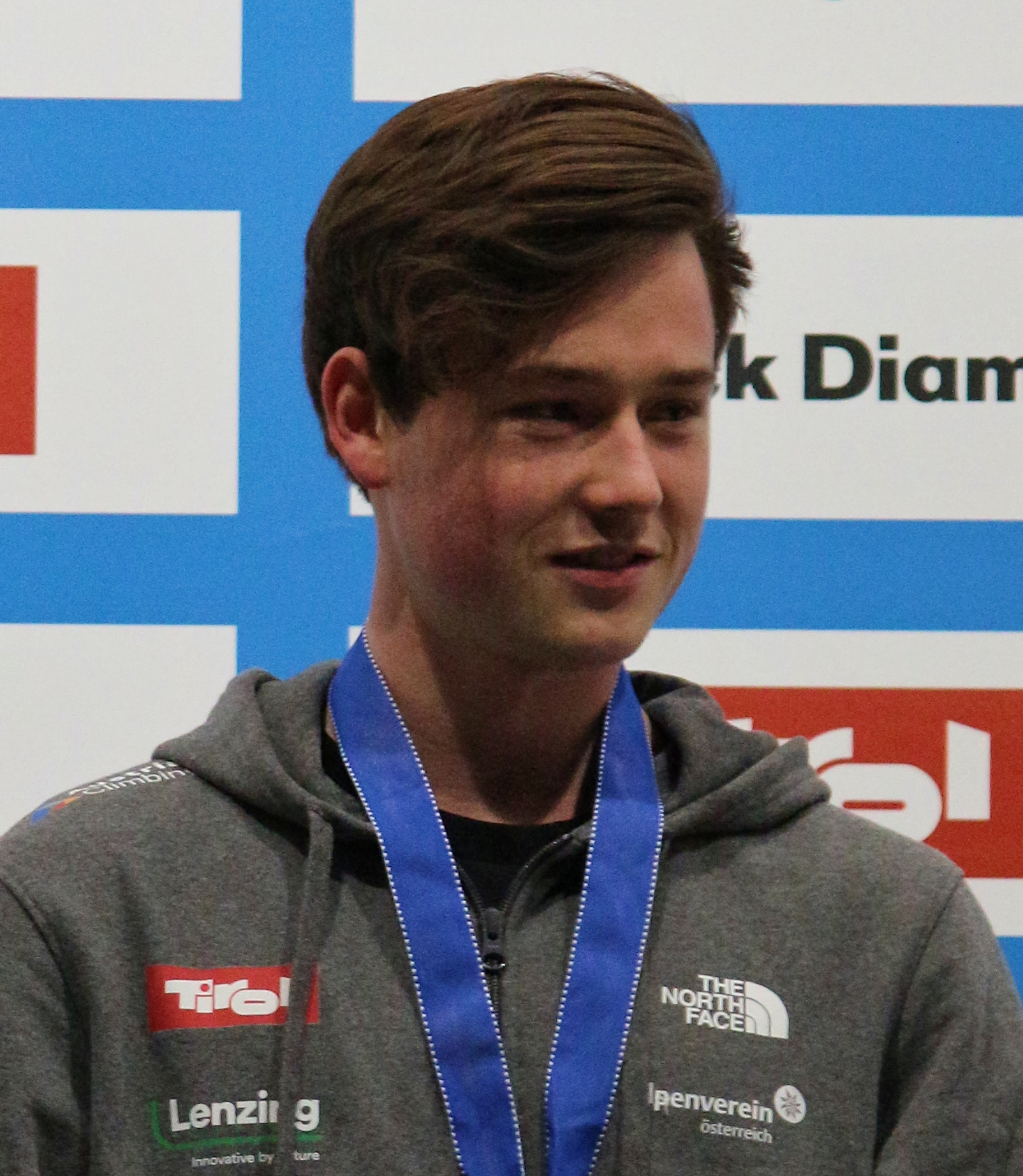
- Užnik in 2019

Personal information
- Born: 11 August 2000 (age 26) Rosenbach, Carinthia, Austria
- Occupation: Professional rock climber
- Height: 173 cm (5 ft 8 in)
- Weight: 60 kg (132 lb)

Climbing career
- Type of climber: Bouldering; Sport climbing; Competition climbing
- Highest grade: Redpoint: 8c+ (5.14c); Bouldering: 9A (V17)
- First ascents: Mount Doom (9A, 2025)
- Known for: Established first Austrian 9A (V17)
Medal record
Men's competition climbing
Representing Austria
European Championships
Gold medal – first place	Munich 2022	Boulder

Nicolai Užnik (born 11 August 2000) is an Austrian professional rock climber specializing in bouldering. He is known for his first ascent of Mount Doom, the first grade 9A (V17) in Austria and one of the hardest boulders in the world. In competition climbing, Užnik is a three-time Austrian bouldering champion (2020, 2022, 2023) and won gold at the 2022 European Bouldering Championships. He is of Slovene origin.

== Climbing career ==
=== Bouldering ===
In 2023, Užnik climbed Emotional Landscapes in Maltatal, Austria. Originally graded 8C (V15), Užnik upgraded the boulder to 8C+ (V16) due to a broken foothold which made the climb harder than previous ascents.

In November 2024, Užnik flashed American Gangster, an 8B+ (V14) established by Daniel Woods. It was the hardest flash of his career; Gripped magazine called the performance "near-flawless". The same month, he became the first to repeat Unison, an 8C (V15) by Aidan Roberts.

Užnik nearly flashed Forgotten Gem, an 8C (V15) in Chironico, Switzerland, in January 2025, completing the climb on his second try.

In February 2025, Užnik announced the first ascent of Mount Doom, which he graded 9A (V17), the top grade in bouldering at the time. He had worked on the project starting in 2021, and was only able to perform the individual moves by 2024. The month before his ascent, he fell from the top of the route and twisted his ankle. Despite not having previously climbed 9A, Užnik stated in an interview after he was "quite certain" of the grade, as he had experience attempting Alphane, a consensus 9A in Switzerland. The grade was eventually confirmed by fellow Austrian climber Jakob Schubert, marking it as one of the hardest boulders in the world.

In November 2025, Užnik sent Brain Rot 8C+ (V16) (which he later downgraded to 8C), then came within a single move of a flash of La Force Tranquille 8C (V15). He completed the climb the next day.

=== Competition climbing ===
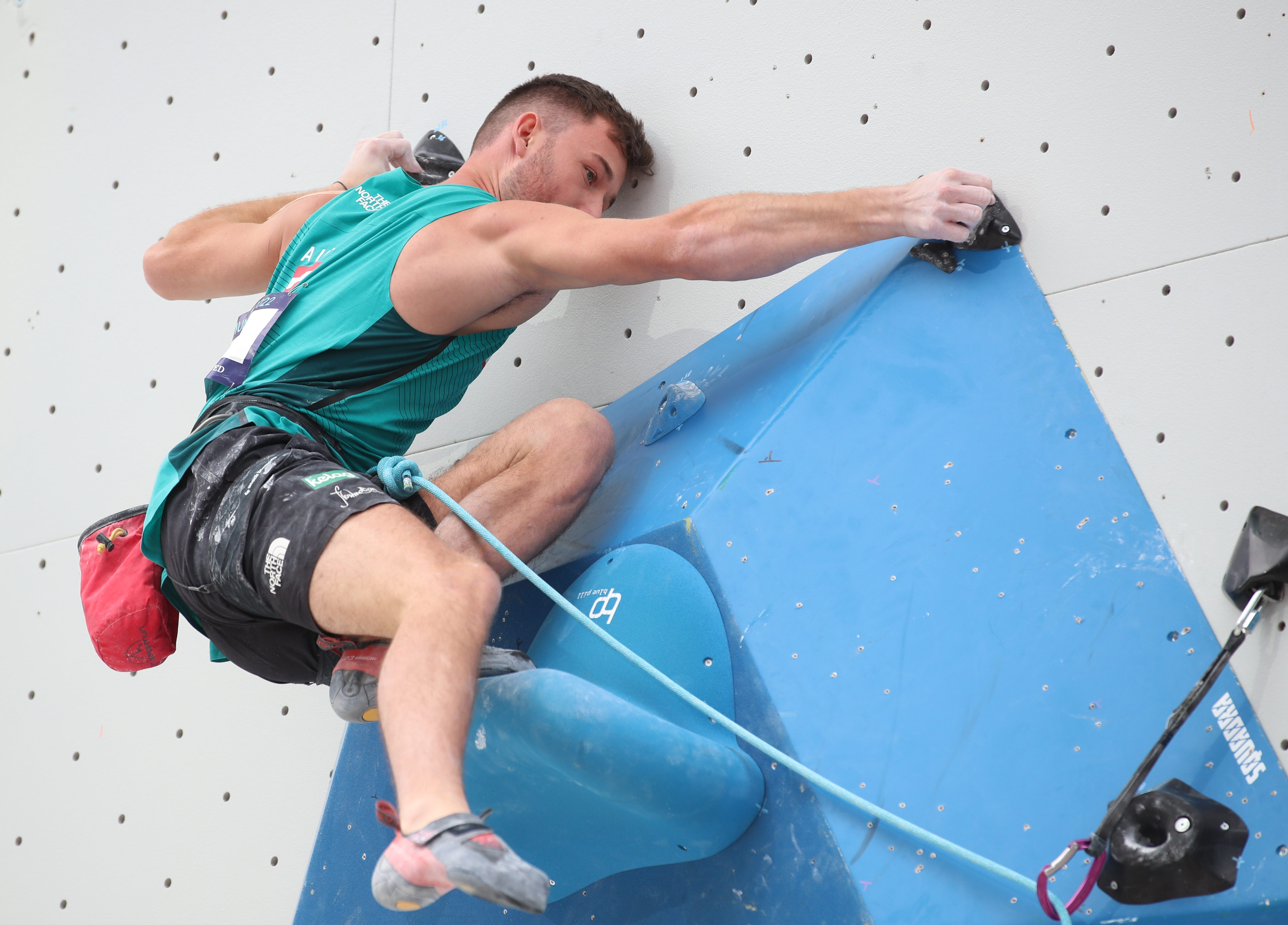
Užnik at the 2022 IFSC Climbing European Championships

In 2020, Užnik won his first national title at the Austrian Bouldering Championships. He won again in 2022 and 2023, where he narrowly beat training partner Jakob Schubert.

Užnik finished fourth in the bouldering event at the 2022 World Games. Later that year, Užnik won gold in bouldering at the European Climbing Championships. After coming 3rd in qualifying, he finished with 49.6 points, ahead of Sam Avezou (49.5) and Adam Ondra (49.0). Užnik's victory came despite recently recovering from a COVID-19 infection, which had harmed his fitness.

At the 2023 Climbing World Championships, Užnik finished fifth in bouldering.

== Notable ascents ==
=== Boulder problems ===
9A (V17):

- Mount Doom – Maltatal (AUT) – February 2025. First ascent, grade confirmed by Jakob Schubert.

8C+ (V16)

- Bügelbrett– Maltatal (AUT) – April 2026. First Ascent, Variation of Bügeleisen 8C
- Full Gem – Chironico (SUI) – January 2026. First Ascent, SitStart to Forgotten Gem 8C

8C (V15)

- Brain Rot – Magic Wood (SUI) – November 2025. Originally an 8C+ - dwongraded by Uznik
- Forgotten Gem – Chironico (SUI) – January 2025. 2nd Go
- Unison – Brione (SUI) – November 2024, first repeat.
- Emotional Landscapes – Maltatal (AUT) – March 2023. Originally an 8C, upgraded due to a broken hold and then later downgraded again by Adam Ondra & Jakob Schubert
- Bügeleisen – Maltatal (AUT) – December 2020.

8B+ (V14)

- American Gangster – Zillertal (AUT) – 8 November 2024, flash.
