= Großer Sonnblick =

Mountain in Austria

Grosser Sonnblick
- Malteiner Sonnblick
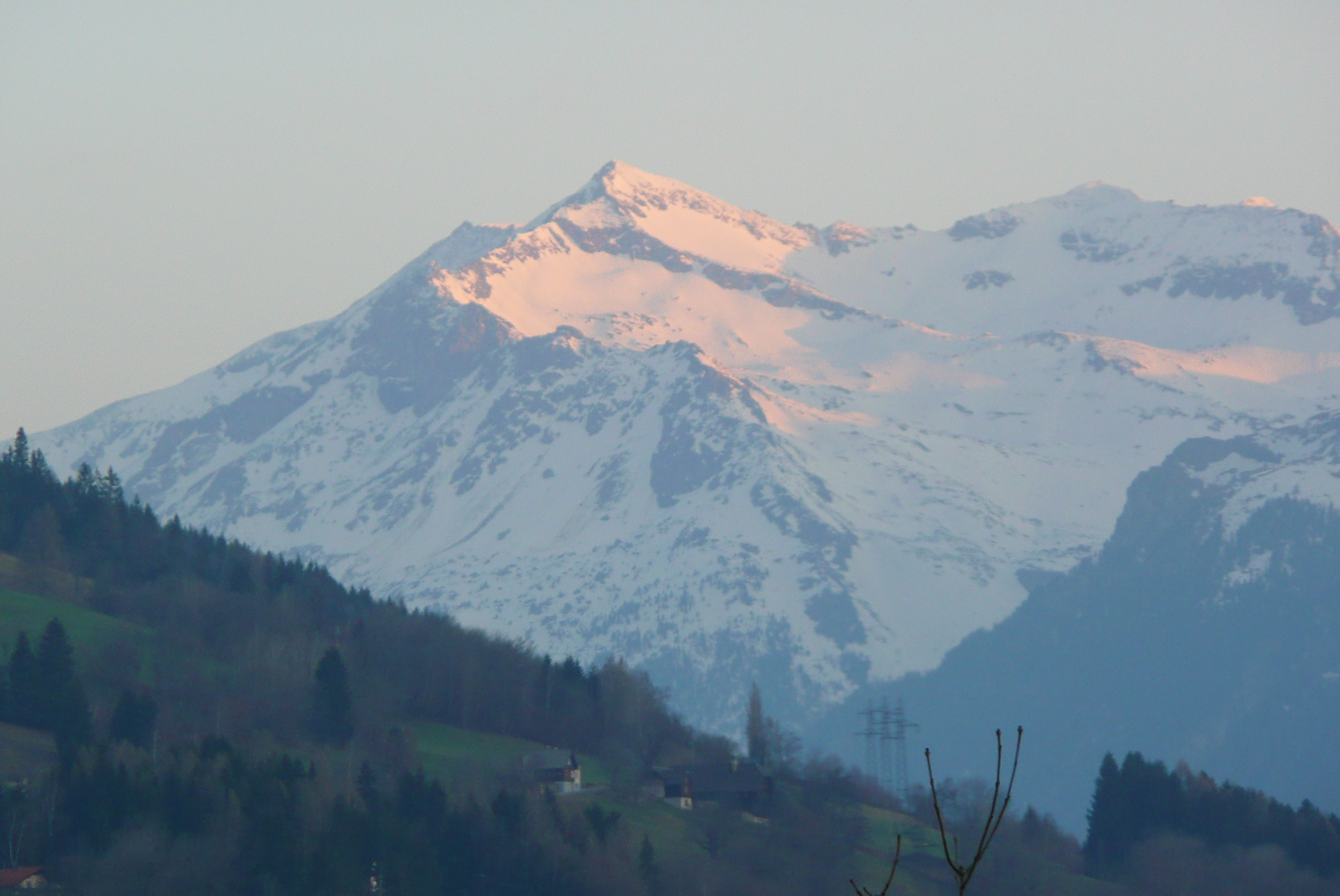
- South face of Grosser Sonnblick (centre) and Mittlerer Sonnblick (right)

Highest point
- Elevation: 3,030 m (9,940 ft)m AA
- Prominence: 133 m (436 ft)
- Listing: Three-thousander
- Coordinates: 47°02′54″N 13°25′22″E

Geography
- Location within Austria
- Location: Carinthia, Austria
- Parent range: Hohe Tauern; Ankogel Group

Climbing
- Easiest route: Ascent from the Gmünder Hut via the Ochsen Hut (unmarked)

The Großer Sonnblick or Malteiner Sonnblick, a mountain with a height of 3,030 m (AA), is a peak in the Ankogel Group of the Hohe Tauern range in Austria. It is the easternmost peak of the Alps with a prominence over 100 metres and with a height exceeding 3,000 metres (9,800 ft).

== Geography ==
The summit is located about in a distance of 18 kilometres (11 mi) northwest of Gmünd and ca. 8.5 km (5.3 mi) northeast of the Hochalmspitze. The normal ascent route that is quite flat in the upper stages from the Gmünder Hut, is not difficult when conditions are dry and free of snow, but it is quite tiring to climb due to the large difference in height that has to be over come (some 1,900 metres). As there are no signposts or markings, good orientation is needed for this tour. In good weather there is an outstanding view from the top to the Großer Hafner (3,076 m above sea level (AA)) and the Hochalmspitze (3,360 m above sea level (AA)).

The Großer Sonnblick has a prominence of 133 m (436 ft) and an isolation of 2,820 m (9,250 ft) to the Großer Hafner.

== Ascent ==
The normal route takes about 5–6 hours from the Gmünder Hut (1,185 m above sea level (AA)) initially along a forest track to the unmanaged Ochsen Hut (1,884 m above sea level (AA)), then over the footbridge of a stream (from here level) northwards across grassy slopes, steep in places to an alm bottom near the lake of Kleiner Melniksee. Next the route heads northwest through a blockfield up to a cirque south of the 'Middle Sonnblick, over a steep, scree slope into a col and finally in a southwesterly direction along the rocky summit ridge (sure-footedness needed) to the highest point.

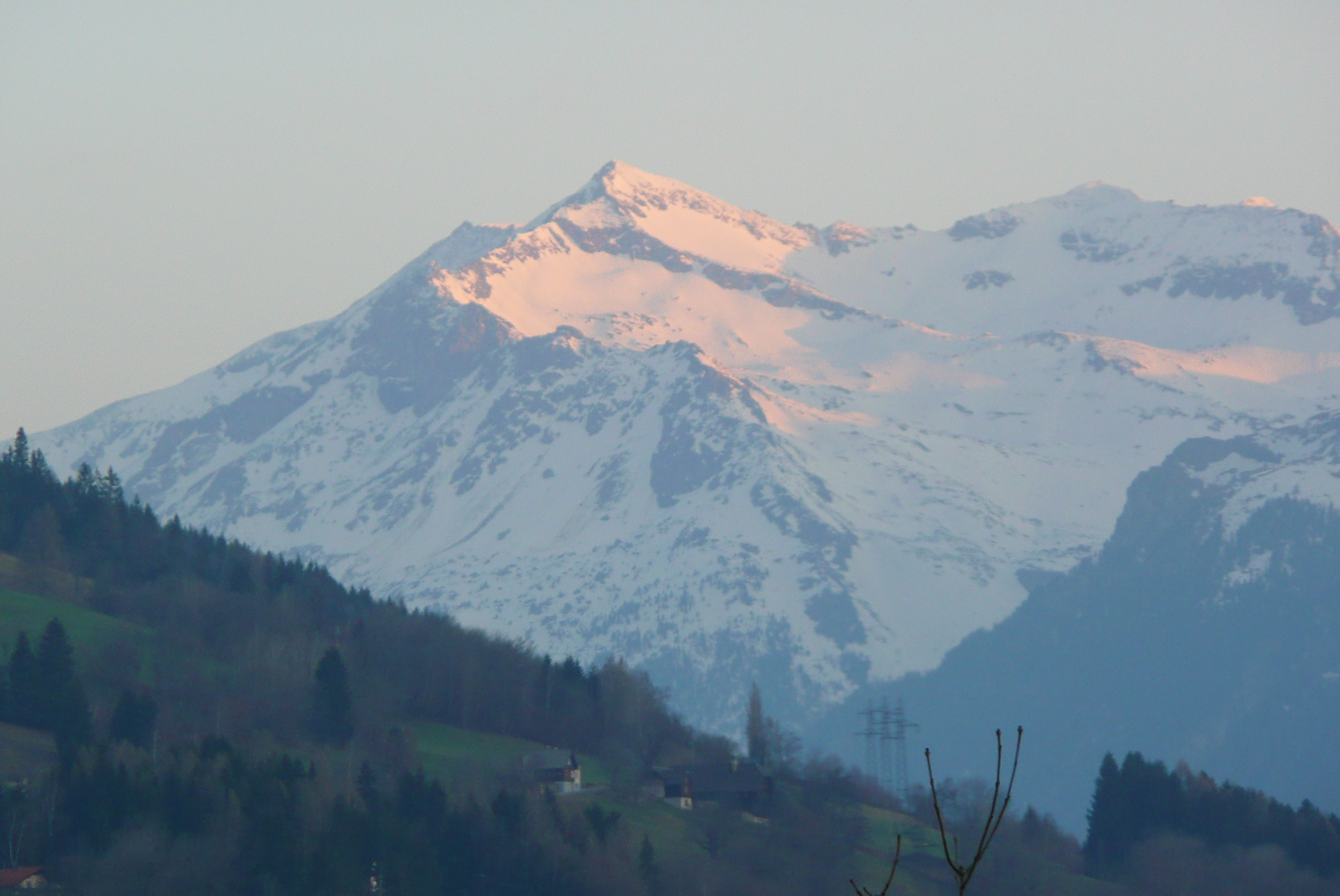
The Großer (centre) and Mittlerer Sonnblick (right), seen from the south

== Neighbouring peak ==
East of the Großer Sonnblick lies the sub-peak of Mittlerer Sonnblick (3,000 m). The two summits are linked by a ridge that can be negotiated without the need for climbing.
