= Mount Doom (climb) =

Bouldering route in Austria

- Location within Austria
- Location: Maltatal, Carinthia, Austria
- Coordinates: 46°59′07″N 13°27′36″E
- Route type: Bouldering
- Technical grade: 9A (V17)
- First ascent: Nicolai Užnik, February 2025

Mount Doom is a 9A (V17) bouldering problem in the Maltatal valley in Austria. The first ascent was by Austrian climber Nicolai Užnik in February 2025, after he worked on the problem for several years. Fellow countryman Jakob Schubert repeated the climb in November 2025, confirming the grade to make it the first 9A-graded boulder problem in Austria, and one of the hardest confirmed boulders in the world.

== Description ==
Mount Doom is a sit start to Hide and Sick, an existing 8B+ (V14) boulder established by Jernej Kruder in 2016. The route climbs a steep, overhanging wall in the Maltatal valley. Mount Doom adds an 8 move intro before the existing top out, making the full route 17 to 18 moves. Užnik stated he found the intro more difficult than Hide and Sick, likely graded 8B+ (V14) or 8C (V15) on its own, with the crux coming at the end with a high foot move required to finish. Užnik described the holds as "crimpy and intense" with constant body tension required throughout the route. After his repeat, Jakob Schubert called the climb "an absolutely amazing line", with the sustained effort fitting his style well.

Užnik began working on Mount Doom in 2021 but did not consider it a serious project until autumn 2024, when he first completed all the moves in isolation. In February 2025, he fell from the top section of the boulder and twisted his ankle, forcing him to take a break before ultimately completing the climb later that month. Užnik called it "the best day of my career" and proposed a grade of 9A, at that point the highest grade in bouldering. Although Užnik had never previously climbed 9A, he had sent multiple 8C and 8C+ boulders and is an accomplished competition climber, having won gold in bouldering at the 2022 IFSC Climbing European Championships.

The first climber to repeat the route was Jakob Schubert, who had previous 9A experience from climbing Alphane in 2023. Schubert was forced to create new beta for the route after Janja Garnbret broke a "crucial hold" during a previous attempt. In total, Schubert worked for eight days before sending the climb and confirming the 9A grade, making it the hardest climb in Austria and one of the hardest bouldering routes in the world.

== See also ==
- List of grade milestones in rock climbing
