= Stappitzer See =

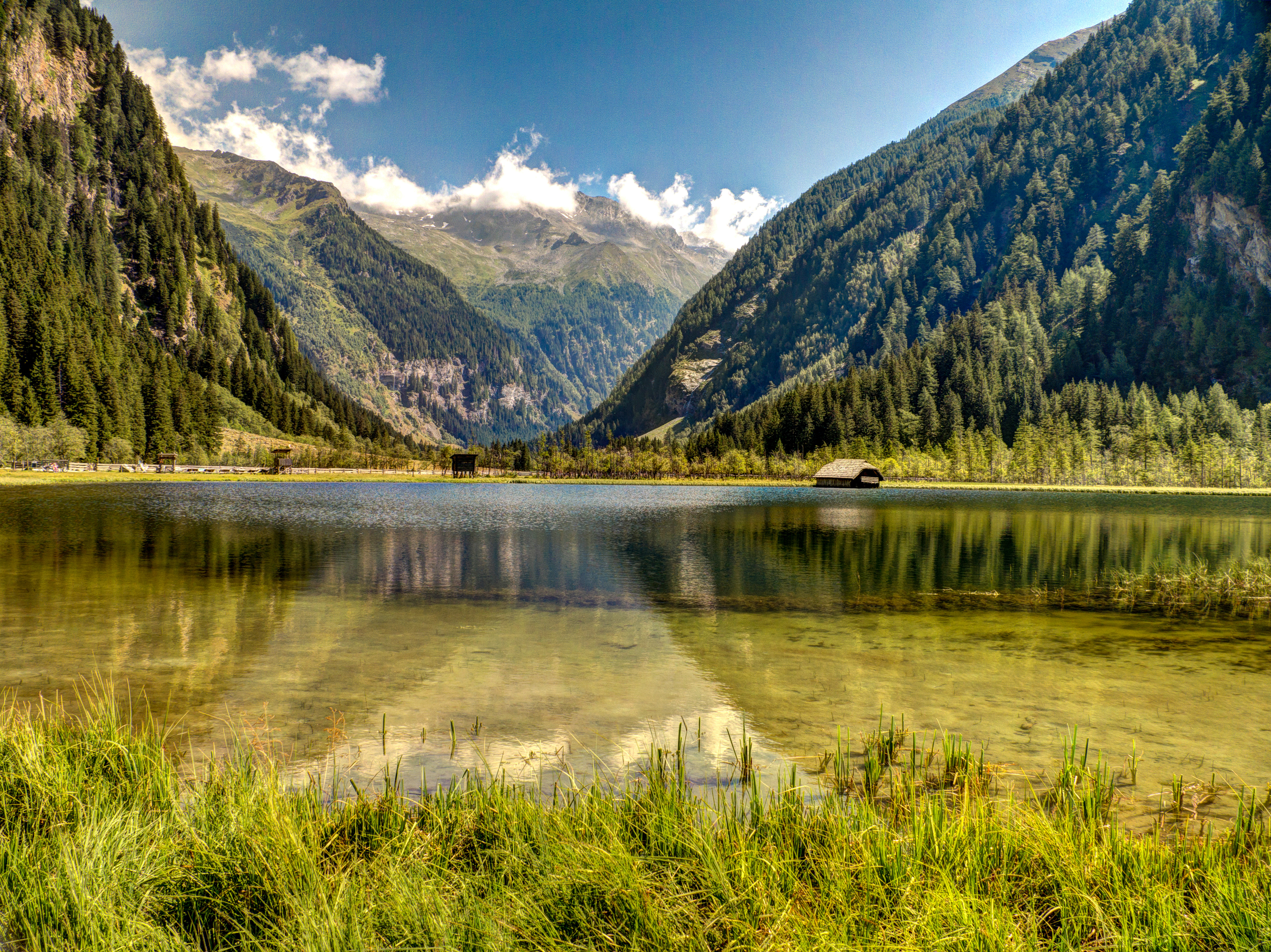
- View to Seebach valley and Ankogel massif

- Location within Kärnten
- Location: Carinthia
- Coordinates: 47°01′04″N 13°11′39″E
- Type: glacial lake
- Primary outflows: Seebach and Mallnitzbach to Möll River
- Basin countries: Austria
- Max. length: 216 m (709 ft)
- Max. width: 8.4 ha (21 acres)
- Surface area: 3.6 ha (8.9 acres)
- Average depth: 3.6 m (12 ft)
- Max. depth: 6 m (20 ft)
- Water volume: 130,000 m^{3} (170,000 yd^{3})
- Surface elevation: 1,273 m (4,177 ft)

Stappitzer See is an Alpine lake in the Hohe Tauern mountain range near Mallnitz in Carinthia, Austria. It is located in the peripheral zone of the Hohe Tauern National Park.

== Geography ==
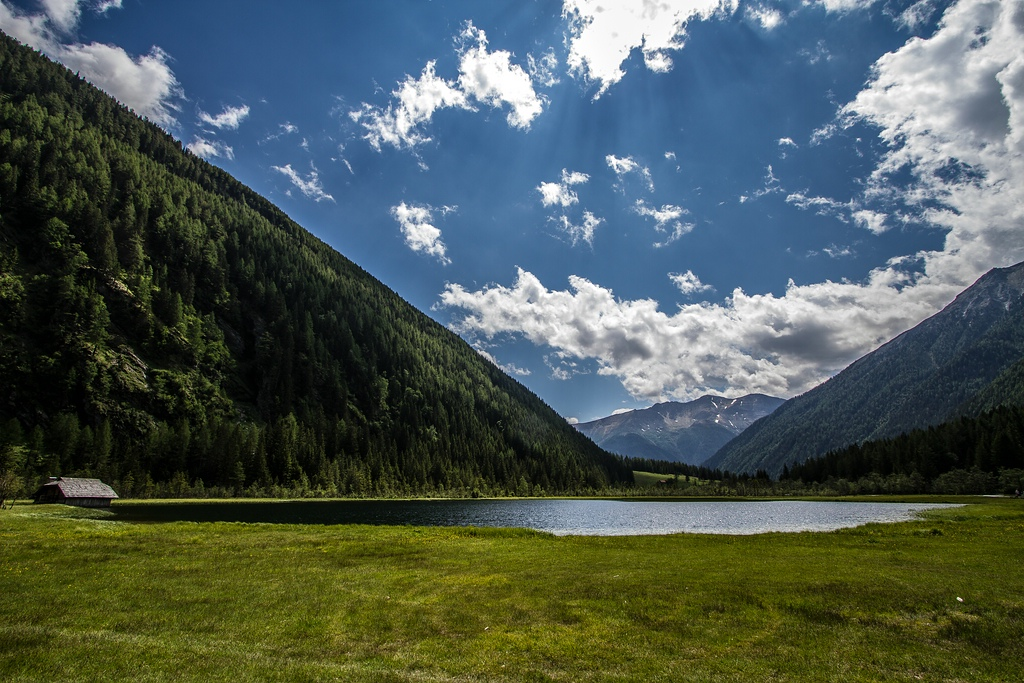
Stappitzer See, view towards Mallnitz

The lake arose during the last glacial period (Würm glaciation), when the retreat of glaciers led to a Sturzstrom landslide of debris damming up the waters in the Mallnitz valley. After many thousand years of a continuous sedimentation process, Stappitzer See confined by several debris cones is a relict from the ice age. It is a remnant of a much larger body of water.

Plans for a reservoir power station developed by the Österreichische Draukraftwerke AG (present-day Verbund AG) in the 1970s failed due to environmental impacts and local opposition. The lake is a resting area for numerous bird species such as the black-throated loon and the western yellow wagtail, as well as a breeding ground for the little grebe, the Alpine swift, and the Eurasian crag martin. In 1986 it was declared a nature reserve; since 2008 it is a Special Protection Area according to the European Birds Directive.
