= Mittlerer Sonnblick =

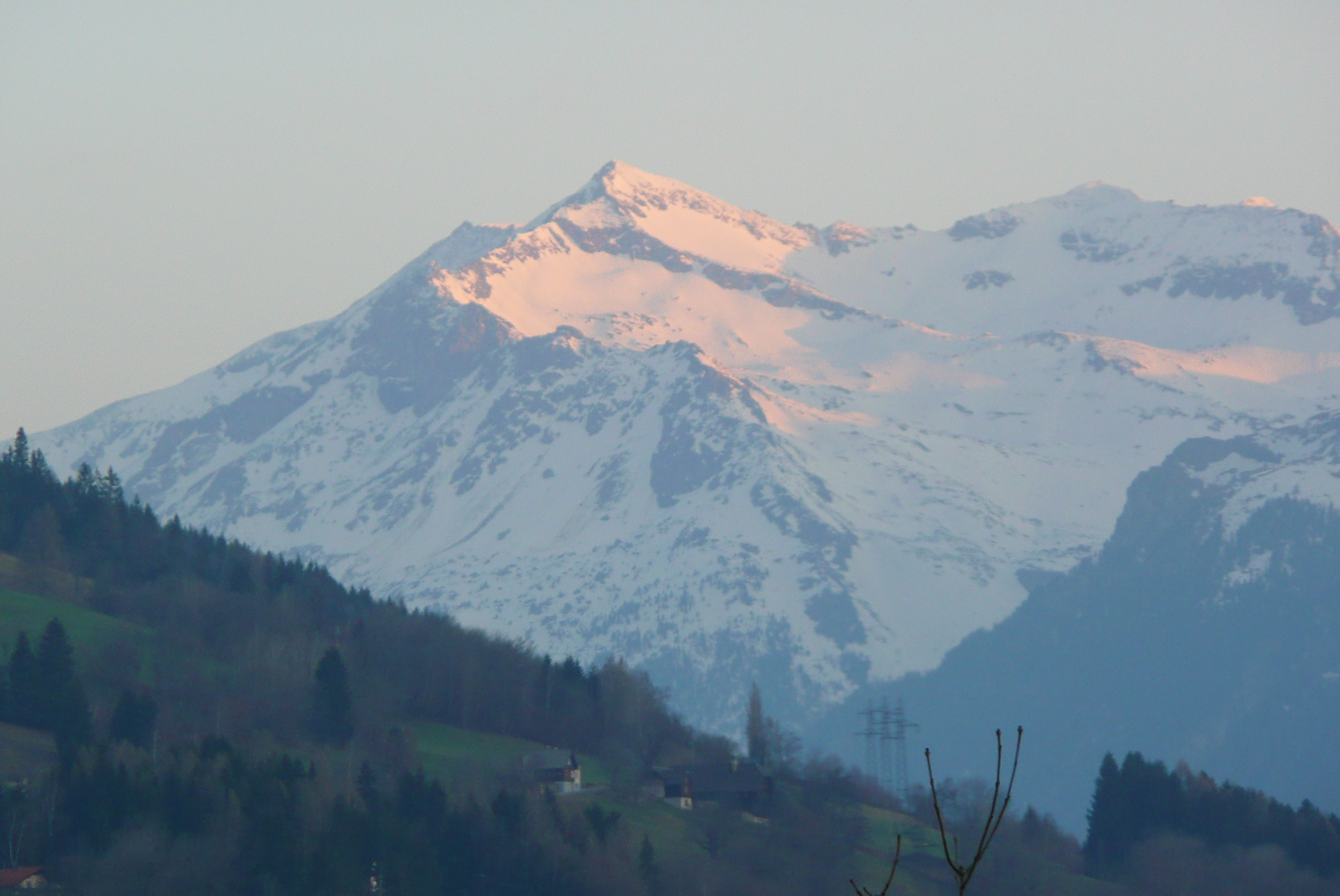
- Großer Sonnblick (centre) and Mittlerer Sonnblick (right)

Highest point
- Elevation: 3,000 m (AA) (9,800 ft)
- Prominence: 100 m
- Isolation: 0.660 km
- Listing: easternmost 3,000er of the Alps
- Coordinates: 47°03′09″N 13°25′51″E

Geography
- Location within Austria
- Location: Border of Carinthia/Salzburg, Austria
- Parent range: Ankogel Group, High Tauern

The Mittlerer Sonnblick is a 3,000 metre high sub-peak of the Großer Sonnblick (3,030 m) to which it is linked by a knife-edge ridge. It is a border peak between the two Austrian federal states of Carinthia and Salzburg. It lies within the Ankogel Group of mountains, a sub-group of the High Tauern.

The mountain has a prominence of 100 metres and an isolation of 660 metres.

The peak has achieved certain renown, no doubt because it is the easternmost three-thousander in the Alps. It is certainly not wrong to say that the Großer Sonnblick is the easternmost mountain in the Alps that exceeds the 3,000-metre mark, but it is not the easternmost point in the Alps that reaches that height.
