= Kölnbrein Dam =

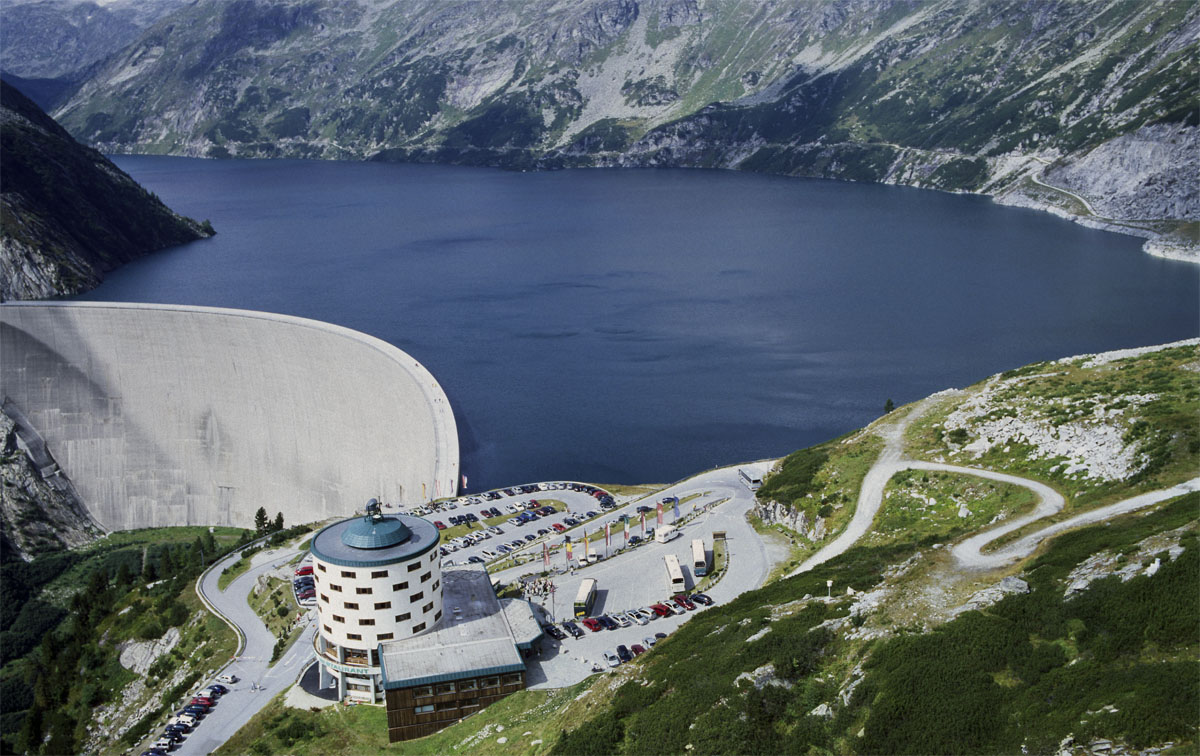

- Location within Austria
- Official name: Kölnbreinsperre
- Location: Malta, Carinthia, Austria
- Coordinates: 47°04′45″N 13°20′21″E
- Status: In use
- Construction began: 1971
- Opening date: 1977

Dam and spillways
- Type of dam: Concrete arch
- Impounds: Malta River
- Height: 200 m (660 ft)
- Length: 626 m (2,054 ft)
- Width (crest): 7.6 m (25 ft)
- Width (base): 41 m (135 ft)
- Dam volume: 1,580,000 m^{3} (2,070,000 cu yd)

Reservoir
- Total capacity: 205,000,000 m^{3} (166,000 acre⋅ft)
- Catchment area: 129 km^{2} (50 sq mi)
- Surface area: 2.55 km^{2} (0.98 sq mi)

Power Station
- Operator: Verbund AG
- Commission date: 1948-1979
- Installed capacity: Upper stage: 120 MW (160,000 hp); Main stage: 730 MW (980,000 hp); Lower stage: 41 MW (55,000 hp); Reisseck plants: 137.5 MW (184,400 hp); Total: 1,028.5 MW (1,379,200 hp)
- Annual generation: 1,216 GWh (4,380 TJ)

The Kölnbrein Dam is an arch dam in the Hohe Tauern range within Carinthia, Austria. It was constructed between 1971 and 1979 and at 200 metres (660 ft) high, it is the tallest dam in Austria. The dam's reservoir serves as the primary storage in a three-stage pumped-storage power system that consists of nine dams, four hydroelectric power plants and a series of pipeline and penstocks. The complex is owned by Verbund power company and is referred to as the Malta-Reisseck Power Plant Group. The installed capacity of the group is 1,028.5 MW and its annual generation is 1,216 gigawatt-hours (4,380 TJ).

While the dam's reservoir was filling, several cracks appeared in the dam and it took more than a decade of repairs before the reservoir could operate at maximum levels. Currently, the Reisseck II pumped-storage power plant is under construction and will effectively connect both the Malta and Reisseck groups and add an additional 430 MW of production capacity.

== Construction ==
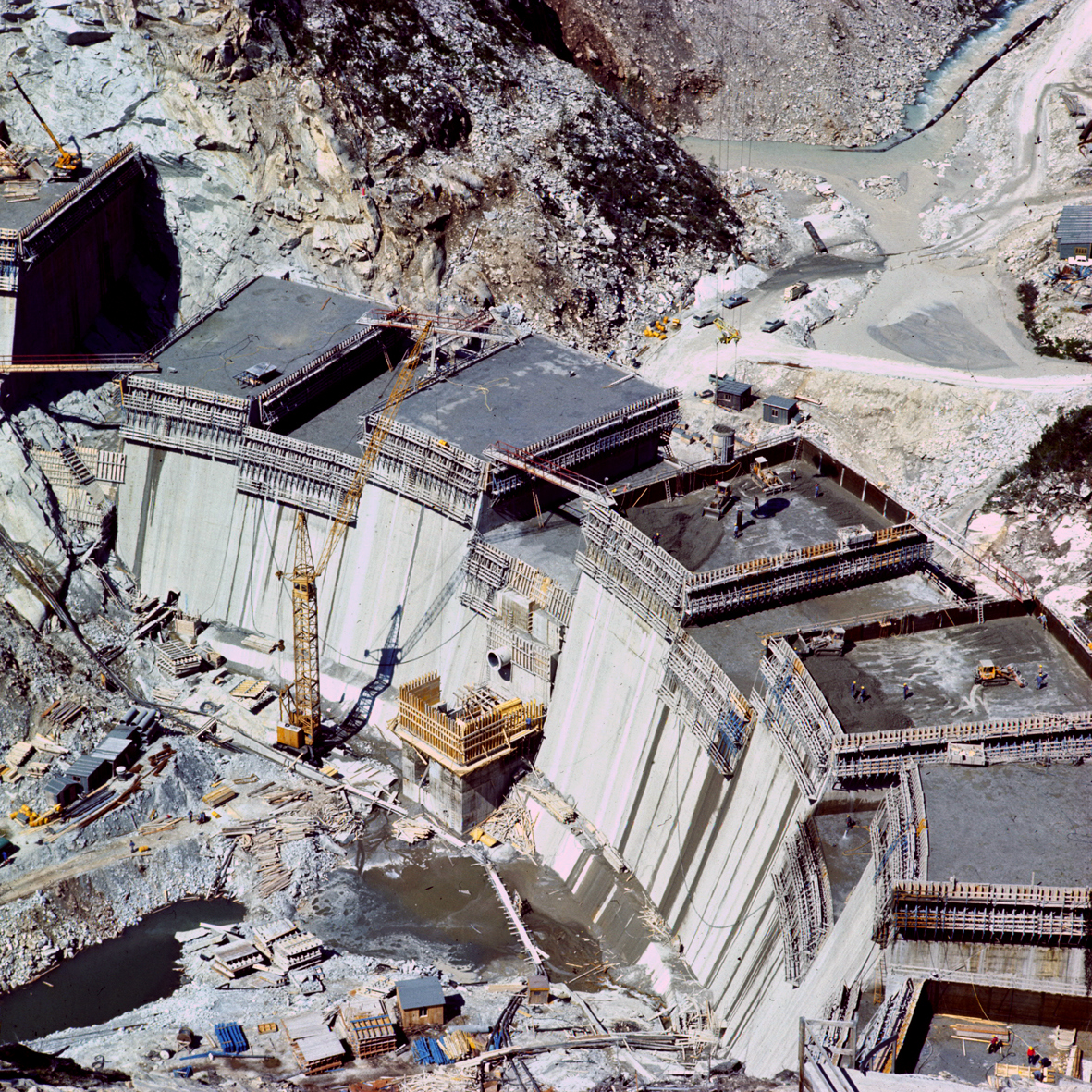
Concrete pouring in 1975

Plans for the dam were already drafted in the late 1930s by the German AEG engineering company, when the Kaprun power plant was built north of the Alpine divide. The project was resumed by the Austrian authorities after World War II with extended exploratory drilling from 1957 onwards, nevertheless the construction of the Kölnbrein Dam did not begin until 1971.

Before cement and other construction materials could be moved on site, an access road had to be constructed. This proved difficult as the steep Malta Valley rises over 300 metres (980 ft) along a 14 kilometres (8.7 mi) stretch and at times has 13 percent gradients. To complete the road, six tunnels were excavated. In 1973, as superstructure construction progressed, cement was transported on site and mixed with aggregate from local sources. To reduce thermal expansion, concrete was poured 30 cubic metres (39 cu yd) at a time and pipes with circulating water were placed throughout the mass. The structure consisted of 30 columns with each joint grouted. Construction conditions high in the valley were not ideal as workers coped with snow and rain along with wind speeds of 80 kilometres per hour (50 mph; 43 kn).

=== Completion and cracks ===
By 1977, construction on the dam had reached an advanced stage where it could begin to impound its reservoir. While filling with water, cracks began to appear in the dam on its upstream heel when the reservoir level was 42 metres (138 ft) below its maximum operating level of 1,902 metres (6,240 ft) above sea level. Uplift pressure on the dam had unexpectedly increased as well and engineers worried that the structure's grout curtain had been damaged. Because the dam is in a U-shaped valley instead of the usual V-shaped for arch dams, the force resulting from hydrostatic pressure is exceptionally strong on the center-bottom (heel) upstream portion of the dam. As excessive water leaked into lower areas of the dam, the water level was drawn down and engineers increased drainage.

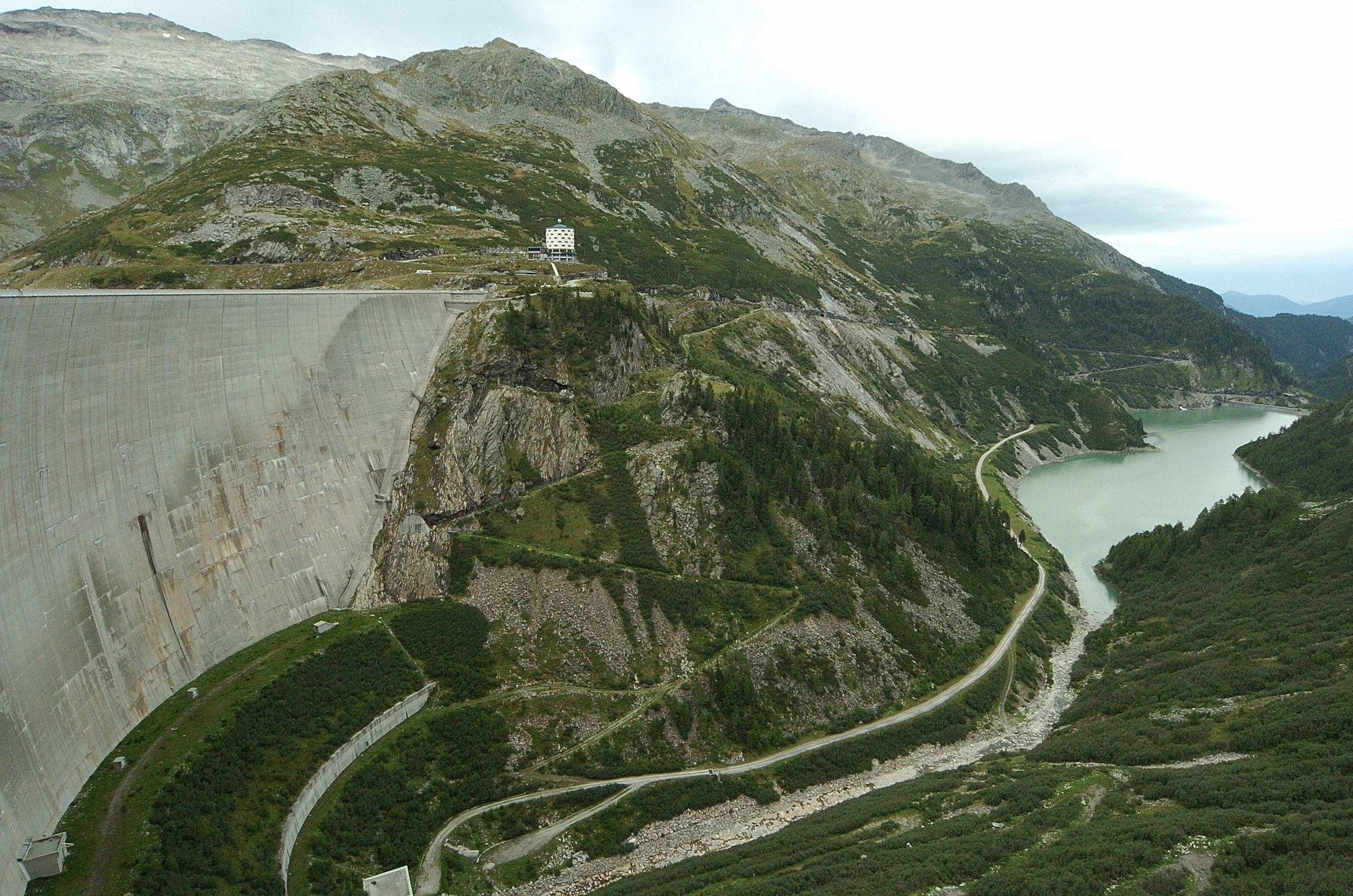
Dam in 2007, with "thrust block" at base

In 1979, the grout curtain was strengthened and another full impoundment was unsuccessfully attempted. Between 1980 and 1981, a polyurethane resin grout was used to re-grout joints and they were frozen during the next impoundment attempt, allowing them to thaw naturally. As remedial works progressed, cracks near the abutments (flanks) of the dam formed as well; on the downstream side and in a horizontal direction. A plastic sheet-covered concrete blanket was laid on the upstream valley floor behind the dam between 1981 and 1983. In the next few years, the sheets had to be repaired and the grout curtain re-grouted. In 1984, the reservoir was able to reach 90 percent full. In 1979 and 1983, it had temporarily reached its maximum level as well but it could not be safely sustained. In 1984, the reservoir levels were limited to 15–20 m (49–66 ft) below maximum, and at those levels it was able to operate safely though at reduced capacities.

Notwithstanding these remedial actions, a long-term solution was required. This came in the form of a 70 m (230 ft) tall "thrust block" that had to be constructed at the downstream base of the dam in order to absorb load from the dam and pressure on its abutments. Its construction was approved in 1988 and executed between 1989 and 1992. Joining the dam and the block are over 600 special neoprene pads which adjust to forces from the reservoir rising and lowering. In addition, joints and fissures in the dam were re-grouted again but with a water-tight resin epoxy. The reservoir was able to operate at maximum levels and operate as normal in 1993.

== Design and operation ==
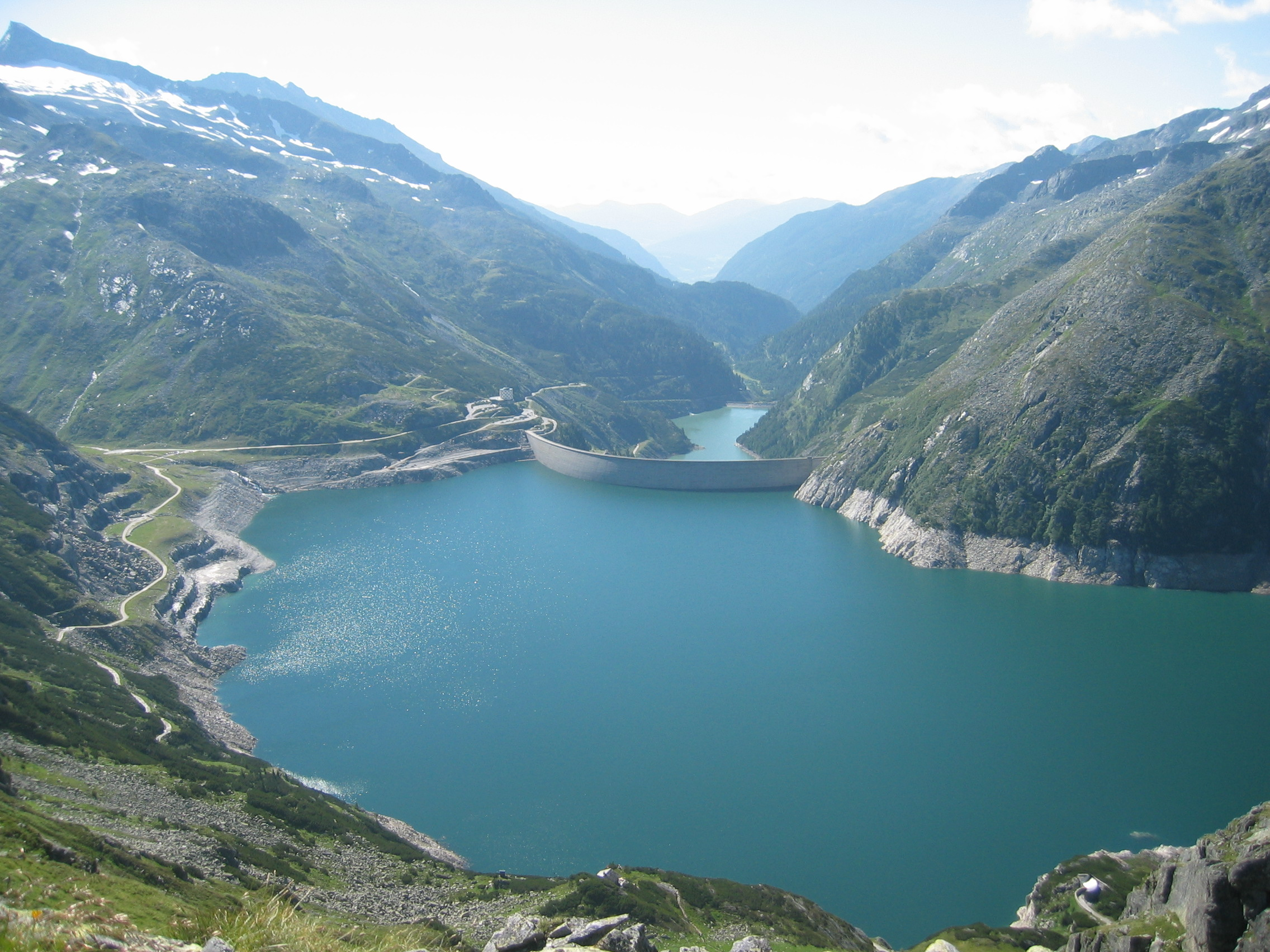
Kölnbrein Dam and Galgenbichl reservoir

The water in the reservoir is used to generate electricity. It is drawn down as electric load demands. Because the catchment area around the dam can only supply half the needed water to sustain its reservoir levels, a series pumps and pumped-storage power plants are utilized to supplement storage capacity. These pumps operate during periods of low power demand, filling the reservoir. When demand is high, water is released back into the system to produce hydroelectricity.

Immediately downstream from the Kölnbrein Dam is the Galgenbichl dam and reservoir. This reservoir serves to receive water from several different locations in Malta via pipeline and is the lower reservoir for the Upper stage pumped-storage power station. From the northeast, water is pumped in from several smaller reservoirs and tributaries.

=== Reisseck-Kreuzeck power plants ===
The water collected above in the Reisseck mountains runs downhill towards the valley of the Möll River. Water is principally received from sources and Kreuzeck mountains to the south though. Of the power plant group, the Reisseck-Kreuzeck plants were constructed between 1948 and 1961 and the Malta group from 1971 to 1979.

On the south side of the Möll River, water is used to generate power at the Niklai power station near Sachsenburg. From there, the water is then received at the Rosswiese reservoir and utilized to generate power at the Kolbnitz station down in the Möll Valley. At Kolbnitz, water can be released into the river which flows into a reservoir created by the Rottau Dam. This reservoir also serves as the lower reservoir for pumping by the Rottau (Main stage) power plant which is located downstream of Kolbnitz.

Water can also be received and pumped from sources to the north which primarily includes the Grosser Mühldorfer reservoir (Reisseck annual reservoir). The Grosser Mühldorfer also receives water from the Kleiner Mühldorfer, Hochalmsee and Radlsee reservoirs as well. From the Grosser Mühldorfer, water can be released back down to Kolbnitz for power production. Additional water from the Reisseck daily reservoir, about halfway between Grosser and Kolbnitz, can be used as well. This completes the Reisseck scheme of plants which all together have an installed capacity of 138 MW.

In the Malta group, water from the Rottau reservoir down in the Möll River Valley is pumped via the Main stage (Rottau) to the Galgenbichl reservoir below the Kölnbrein. Along the tunneled route, the Gösskar reservoir, and various tributaries provide additional water via pipeline as well. Water storage in the Galgenbichl reservoir is eventually pumped via the Upper storage pumped-storage station into the Kölnbrein reservoir. When generating electricity, water from the upper Kölnbrein reservoir is released about 200 m (656 ft) back down to the Upper stage power plant. The upper stage consists of two reversible Francis turbine generators with a total installed capacity of 120 MW. Water can then be released back through 20.4 km (13 mi) of pipeline south towards the Möll River Valley. Ultimately, it will drop from 1,704 m (5,591 ft) above sea level to 598 m (1,962 ft) through two 1.9 km (1 mi) penstocks where the Main stage (Rottau) power plant is located.

The Main stage is operated by four Pelton turbines with an installed capacity of 730 MW. Water released from this plant enters Rottau reservoir on the Möll. Prior its confluence with the Drava (Drau) River, water is diverted through a 2.5 km (2 mi) canal on the right bank of the river which converts into a 1.75 km (1 mi) long tunnel which feeds the Lower stage (Möllbrücke) power station. It is powered by two Kaplan turbine generators with an installed capacity of 120 MW. From the Lower stage, water is discharged into the Drau upstream from the mouth of the Möll. The turbines are up to 92% efficient.

Malta-Reisseck Power Plant Group
Name	Type	Capacity (MW)	Annual generation (GWh)	Commission	Coordinates
Malta upper stage (Galgenbichl)	Pumped-storage	120	76	1979	47°04′08″N 13°21′16″E
Malta main stage (Rottau)	Pumped-storage	730	715	1979	46°52′14″N 13°19′46″E
Malta lower stage (Möllbrücke)	Run-of-the-river	41	120	1979	46°49′59″N 13°21′36″E
Reisseck annual reservoir (Kolbnitz)	Pumped-storage	67.7	73	1962	46°54′55″N 13°22′28″E
Reisseck daily reservoir (Kolbnitz)	Storage	23.2	62	1953	46°52′52″N 13°20′13″E
Reisseck/Kreuzeck reservoir (Kolbnitz)	Storage	45	163	1963	46°51′37″N 13°18′18″E
Niklai	Inter-system	1.6	7	1960	46°49′29″N 13°17′39″E
Total		1,028.5	1,216		

Dams of the Malta-Reisseck Power Plant Group
Name	Type	Height	Length	Storage capacity	Elevation	Catchment area	Year built	Coordinates
Kölnbrein	Arch	200 m (656 ft)	626 m (2,054 ft)	205,000,000 m^{3} (166,196 acre⋅ft)	1,902 m (6,240 ft)	129 km^{2} (50 sq mi)	1977	47°04′45″N 13°20′21″E
Galgenbichl	Gravity/rock-fill	50 m (164 ft)	200 m (656 ft)	4,800,000 m^{3} (3,891 acre⋅ft)	1,704 m (5,591 ft)	53 km^{2} (20 sq mi)	1974	47°03′59″N 13°21′05″E
Gösskar	Embankment	55 m (180 ft)	260 m (853 ft)	520,000 m^{3} (422 acre⋅ft)	1,704 m (5,591 ft)		1979	46°58′56″N 13°19′52″E
Radlsee	Rock-fill	12 m (39 ft)	212 m (696 ft)	2,600,000 m^{3} (2,108 acre⋅ft)	2,399 m (7,871 ft)	2 km^{2} (1 sq mi)	1958	46°56′26″N 13°22′33″E
Hochalmsee	Gravity/rock-fill	34 m (112 ft)	357 m (1,171 ft)	4,100,000 m^{3} (3,324 acre⋅ft)	2,379 m (7,805 ft)	160 km^{2} (62 sq mi)	1958	46°56′53″N 13°20′17″E
Kleiner Mühldorfer	Gravity	41 m (135 ft)	159 m (522 ft)	2,800,000 m^{3} (2,270 acre⋅ft)	2,379 m (7,805 ft)	160 km^{2} (62 sq mi)	1958	46°55′18″N 13°22′12″E
Grosser Mühldorfer	Gravity	46 m (151 ft)	433 m (1,421 ft)	7,700,000 m^{3} (6,242 acre⋅ft)	2,319 m (7,608 ft)	158 km^{2} (61 sq mi)	1957	46°54′55″N 13°22′29″E
Rottau	Gravity	13.7 m (45 ft)	68 m (223 ft)	500,000 m^{3} (405 acre⋅ft)	598 m (1,962 ft)		1979	46°51′49″N 13°20′06″E
Rosswiese	Embankment	16 m (52 ft)	320 m (1,050 ft)	204,000 m^{3} (165 acre⋅ft)	1,194 m (3,917 ft)	115 km^{2} (44 sq mi)	1958	46°51′59″N 13°20′06″E

=== Expansion: Reisseck II ===
Verbund began constructing the Reisseck II pumped-storage station in 2010, and started testing in 2016. It uses the Grosser Mühldorfer reservoir as an upper reservoir and the Gösskar reservoir as its lower. A 5.3-kilometre (3 mi) seven-meter-diameter headrace tunnel from the Grosser Mühldorfer was excavated and connects to the existing headrace tunnel of the Rottau main stage. Feeding water into the Reisseck II power station is a 817-metre-long (2,680 ft) penstock. The power station is located 200 m (656 ft) underground and contains two 215 MW reversible Francis turbines. It has a total installed capacity of 430 MW and increases the overall capacity of the power plant group by 40%, from 1,026 to 1,459 MW. The cost was €400 million.

== Tourism ==
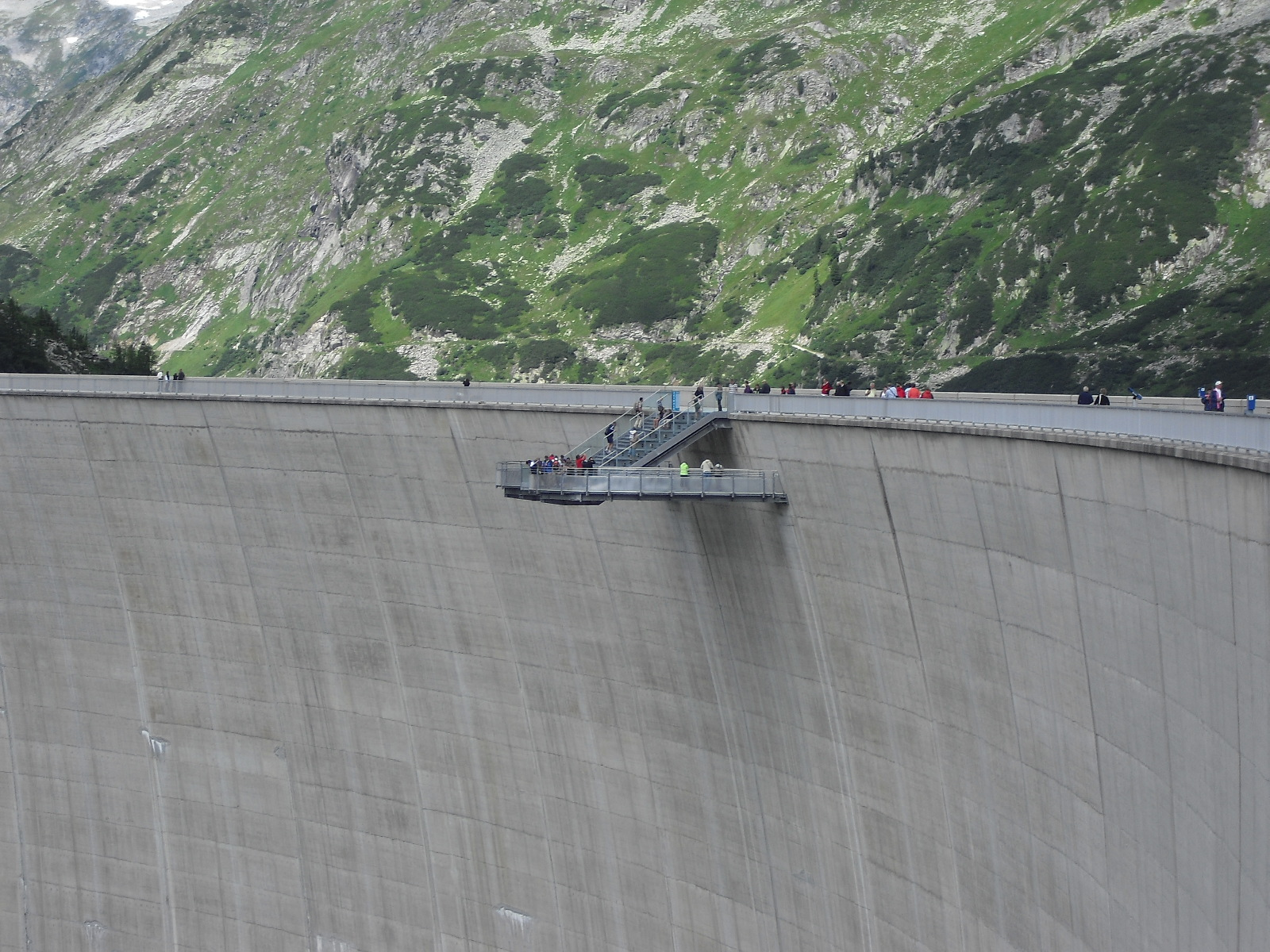
Skywalk

The Kölnbrein Dam is the terminus of a 14.3 kilometres (8.9 mi) long scenic route through the Maltatal, the former construction site road, including a restaurant, a hotel and an exhibition on hydroelectricity. Verbund also offers tours of the power plant group and the dam. Tours on the dam are conducted daily while the road is open between 9 May and 26 October each year.

In 2010 a "skywalk", a horseshoe-shaped cantilever bridge, was installed on top of the dam for visitors which is also a popular bungee jumping venue. The dam lies within the High Tauern National Park and is a destination for mountaineers as well. Moreover, the reservoir is used by rowers for altitude training.

== In popular culture ==
- The dam features in the 1978 film The Boys From Brazil, standing in for a location in Sweden. The movie was shot between late 1977 and early 1978 and shows the newly erected dam with a low reservoir level. In the film the character of the inspector of the local power company (and former SS Major) is thrown off the top of the snow-covered dam by an assassin sent by a fictional Josef Mengele. Various shots around and on top of the dam are shown in the 3 minute 15 second scene at approximately 55 minutes into the film.
- The dam also appears in the 2017 Indian film Vivegam in the opening sequence of the film.
