= Three-thousander =

Three-thousander is a definition that varies by country. In Europe, the term refers to mountains with a height of at least 3,000 metres (9,800 ft), but less than 4,000 metres (13,000 ft) above sea level. Similar terms are commonly used for mountains of other height brackets e. g. four-thousanders or eight-thousanders. In Britain, the term refers to mountains above 3,000 feet (910 m).

== Climatological significance ==
In temperate latitudes three-thousanders play an important role, because even in summer they lie below the zero degree line for weeks. Thus the chains of three-thousanders always form important climatic divides and support glaciation—in the Alps the 3,000 metres (9,800 ft) contour is roughly the general limit of the "nival step"; only a few glaciated mountains are under 3,000 metres (9,800 ft) (the Dachstein, the easternmost glaciated mountain in the Alps, is, at 2,995 metres (9,826 ft), not a three-thousander). In the Mediterranean, however, the three-thousanders remain free of ice and, in the tropics, they are almost insignificant from a climatic perspective; here the snow line lies at around 4,500 metres (14,800 ft) to 5,000 metres (16,000 ft), and in the dry continental areas (Trans-Himalayas, Andes) it may be up to 6,500 metres (21,300 ft) high.

== Alpinism ==
The designation "three-thousander" is often used for touristic reasons when only a few individual summits exceed this height – e.g., in the Southern Alps, in the eastern part of Austria, in the Limestone Alps, in the Pyrenees or the rest of Europe. For example, the Parseierspitze in the Lechtal Alps at 3,036 metres (9,961 ft) is the only three-thousander in the Northern Limestone Alps.

In the Alps or Pyrenees, expeditions to areas of over 3,000 metres (9,800 ft), with their often steep mountainsides and sudden changes in weather conditions, require mountaineers to have considerable experience and weatherproof equipment, which distinguishes them from ascents of many two-thousanders.

The term "easy three-thousander" (Leichte Dreitausender) or "Hikable three-thousander" (Wanderdreitausender) describes mountains above 3,000 metres (9,800 ft) with routes that do not pose any particular challenges. Typical "easy" three-thousanders, for example, include the Piz Boe (3,152 metres (10,341 ft)) in South Tyrol, which is an hour's walk from the Pordoi Cable Car, or the 3,033 metres (9,951 ft) high Piz Umbrail, accessible from the Umbrail Pass. Amongst the highest easy three-thousanders in the Alps are the Üsser Barrhorn (3,620 metres (11,880 ft)) in the Wallis Alps and the Monte Vioz (3,645 metres (11,959 ft), southern Ortler Alps). For ascents of these mountains the main risk is the lack of acclimatisation at these heights. The highest technically accessible three-thousanders in the Alps (and also the highest cable cars in Europe) are the Klein Matterhorn (3,883 metres (12,740 ft)) near Zermatt and the Aiguille du Midi (3,842 metres (12,605 ft)) on Mont Blanc.

== Alps ==
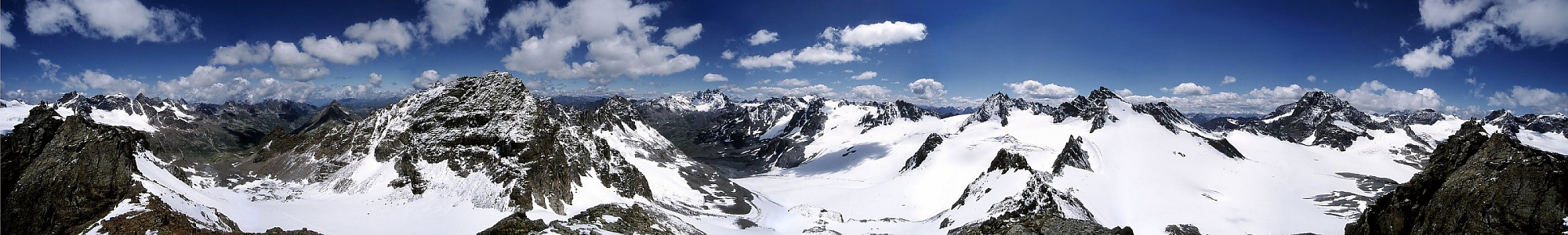
Silvretta panorama with peaks between 3,000 and 3,400 metres (9,800 and 11,200 ft)

The easternmost three-thousanders in the Alps are in the Hafner Group in the east of the High Tauern (from west to east: Großer Hafner 3,076 metres (10,092 ft), Lanischhafner 3,018 metres (9,902 ft), Lanischeck 3,022 metres (9,915 ft), Großer or Malteiner Sonnblick 3,030 metres (9,940 ft), and Mittlerer Sonnblick 3,000 metres (9,800 ft)). The northernmost 3,000ers are in the northern chains of the High Tauern, Zillertal, Ötztal, and Stubai Alps (as well as the Parseierspitze in the Lechtal Alps). The southernmost 3,000ers are on the main chain of the Maritime Alps (Argentara Group), the Mercantour and the Pelat Group with about a dozen main peaks over 3,000 metres (9,800 ft) above sea level. In the eastern Alps the southern boundary lies in the Bergamo Alps (3 main summits), of the Adamello–Presanella Group (about a dozen) and the Dolomites (about 50 peaks). So the ranges of the Alps that contain mountains over the 3,000 metres (9,800 ft) mark comprise roughly two thirds of the area, with the 3,000er zone in the Western Alps coming much closer to the edge of the Alpin region than in the Eastern Alps with their extensive system of foothills. The easternmost 3,000er is over 200 kilometres (120 mi) from the Pannonian Alpine perimeter, the westernmost only about 60 kilometres (37 mi) from the Rhone valley. A large part of this sensitive, high Alpine region is protected by conservation areas, but it also forms the touristic heart of the Alps.

Easternmost three-thousander in the Alps:	Mittlerer Sonnblick	3,000 m	Austria	47°03′12.8″N 13°25′54.9″E
Westernmost three-thousander in the Alps:	Le Rochail	3,023 m	France	44°58′51.0″N 6°01′41.0″E
Northernmost three-thousander in the Alps:	Kempsenkopf	3,090 m	Austria	47°11′43.2″N 12°44′52.5″E
Southernmost three-thousander in the Alps:	Mont Clapier	3,045 m	Italy/France	44°06′52.7″N 7°25′11.1″E

Switzerland, France, Austria, and Italy have many hundreds of Alpine peaks over 3,000 metres. Germany's Zugspitze, at 2,964 metres (9,724 ft), just falls below the line, whilst Slovenia's Triglav is well under it. Liechtenstein, despite being the only country lying entirely within the Alps, has no 3,000ers on its territory.

== Rest of Europe ==
Apart from the Alps, the dominant range in Europe – if one excludes the Caucasus, which otherwise, with its Mount Elbrus (5,642 m), would have the highest mountain in the continent – only the following ranges have three-thousanders:

- Pyrenees: Pico de Aneto (3,404m), Pico Posets (3,375m), Monte Perdido (3,355m), Vignemale (3,298m), Pica d'Estats (3,143m). The Pyrenees have more than two hundred three-thousanders
- Baetic Ranges - Sierra Nevada: Mulhacén (3,482 m, highest in southwest Europe), Veleta (3,392m), with a good dozen three-thousander massifs.
- Mount Etna Sicily, Italy, 3,329m

Musala at 2,925 m, the highest mountain in southern Europe outside the Iberian Peninsula, comes 2.5% short of the mark. The Apennine Mountains reach 2,912 m in the Gran Sasso. The Dinaric Alps, Carpathian Mountains, Sistema Central and Cantabrian Mountains are less than 2,700 m high, and the other ranges in Europe are below 2,500 m.

== See also ==
- Two-thousander
- Four-thousander
- Eight-thousander
- List of Alpine three-thousanders
- List of mountains of the Pyrenees over 3000 metres
