= Eva Faschaunerin =

Austrian murderer (c. 1735–1773)

Eva Kary, née Faschauner (c. 1735 – 9 November 1773) was a convicted Austrian murderer. She was the last victim of judicial torture in the Austrian Hereditary Lands of the Habsburg monarchy.

She was the daughter of the Faschauner family of Alpine farmers from Maltaberg in the Duchy of Carinthia. A few weeks after her marriage with Jakob Kary in February 1770, her husband died after experiencing acute pain to his upper body. An autopsy revealed that his death was caused by arsenic poisoning. Tried for murder before the Gmünd county court, Eva pleaded guilty after about three years in prison during torture. Condemned as a murderer and sentenced to death by decapitation on 20 March 1773, her clemency petition was denied by the superior court in Vienna and she was beheaded.

As torture was officially abolished by a 1776 decree of Empress Maria Theresa and her son Joseph II, Eva Faschaunerin was considered the last person to be a victim of judicial torture in Austria. She was also the last person to be sent to the gallows from Gmünd.
