= Fallbach Waterfall =

Waterfall

Coordinates: 46°58′21.6″N 13°28′40.5″E

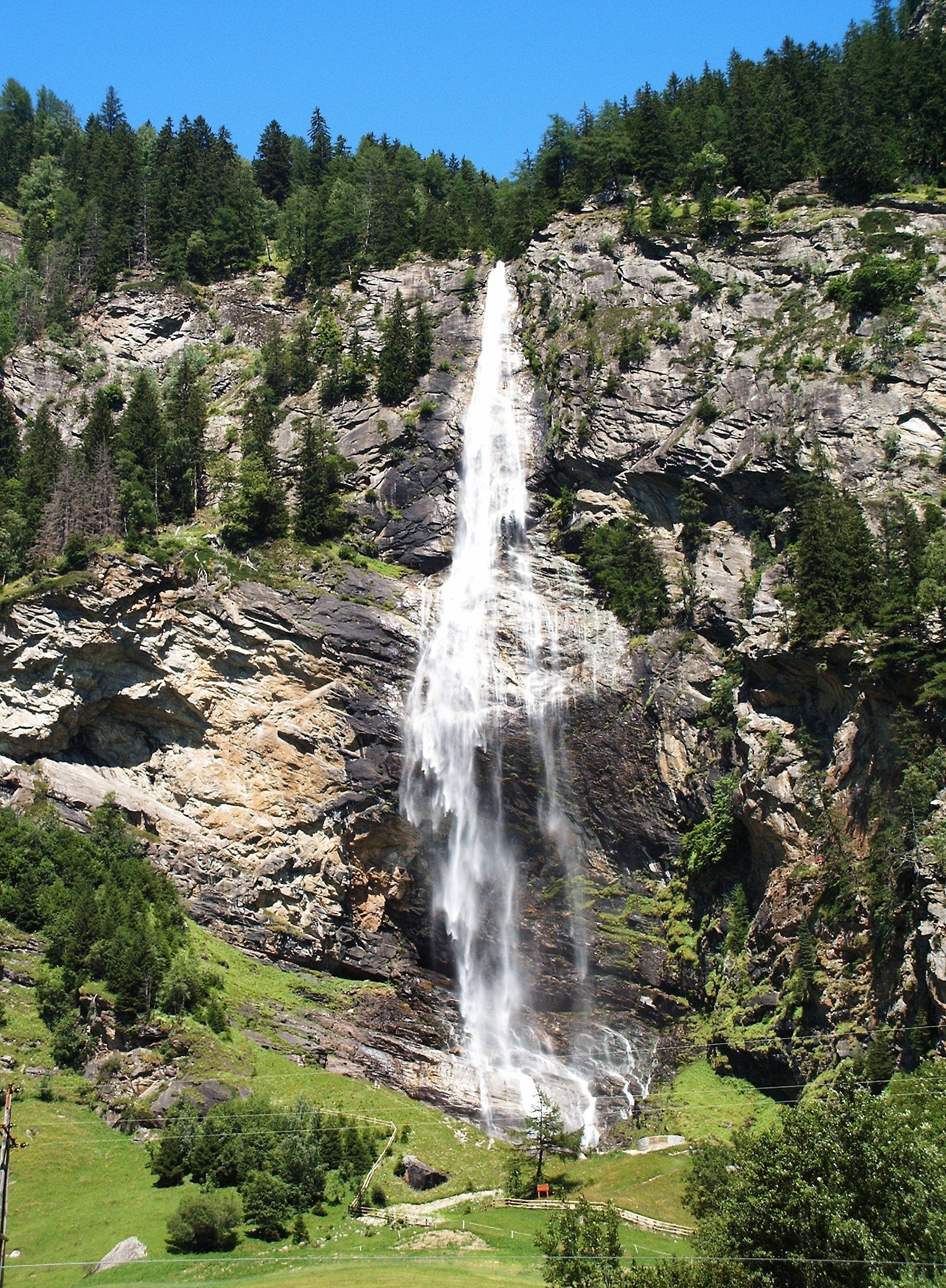
Fallbach falls

Fallbach Waterfall is a waterfall in the Maltatal valley of Austria in the Austrian Alps near Malta. It is particularly dramatic during snow-melt season. The waterfall is part of the Hohe Tauern National Park.
