= Maltatal =

Valley in the Central Eastern Alps

Coordinates: 46.9025°N 13.5328°E

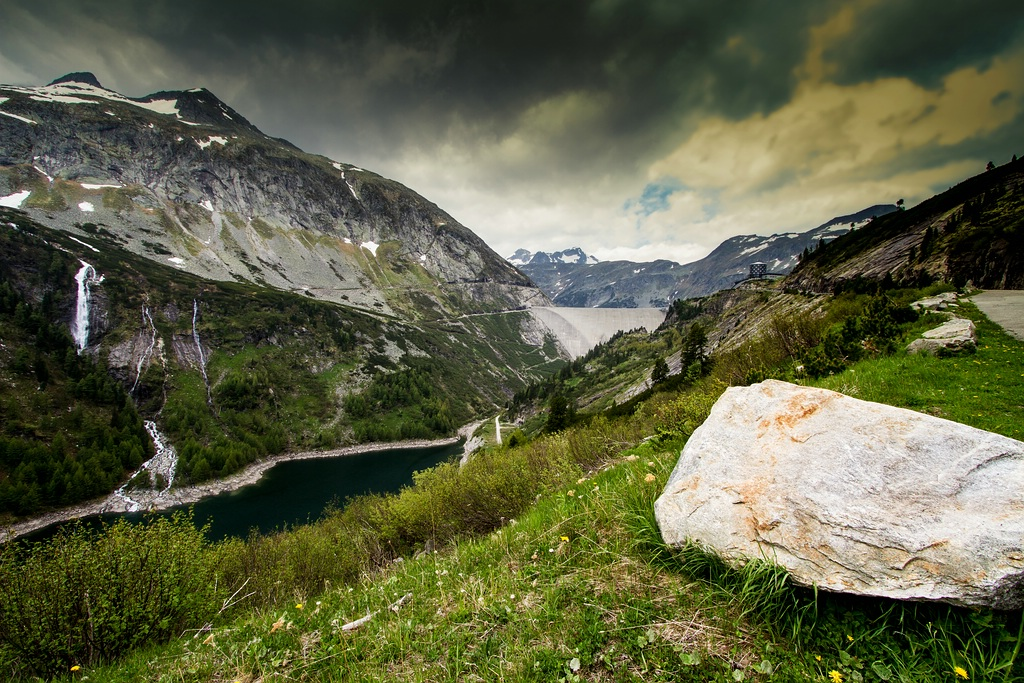
Upper Malta valley looking towards Kölnbrein Dam and Ankogel massif

The Maltatal (Slovene: Dolina reke Malte) is a valley in the High Tauern mountain range of the Central Eastern Alps. It is located just Northwest of Gmünd, Carinthia. It follows the course of the Malta river down towards its confluence with the Lieser, itself a left tributary of the Drava. Most of the area belongs to the municipality of Malta in Carinthia, Austria.

The upper Maltatal ends at the Kölnbrein Dam east of the Ankogel Group, from where the Malta stream flows southeastwards about 38 km (24 mi) down along the mountains of the Reisseck Group to Gmünd and into the Lieser river. The valley is known for its many waterfalls during snowmelt season, therefore also called the 'Valley of Falling Waters'. An 18 km (11 mi) long scenic route, the former construction road of the Malta-Reisseck Power Plant Group with numerous serpentines and six tunnels leads up to the dam at 1,933 m (6,342 ft), site of a hotel and a hydropower exhibition.

After the Austrian Anschluss to Nazi Germany, beginning in 1941 the Malta Valley was the site of a labour camp where deported prisoners of war originating from the Soviet Union were forced to work in a granite quarry supplying a Reichsautobahn construction site in nearby Spittal an der Drau (the present-day Tauern Autobahn). At least 21 inmates died from the inhuman working conditions; a memorial marks their burial place at a nearby chapel.

== See also ==
- Fallbach Waterfall
