= Hochalmspitze =

Mountain in the Ankogel group in Carinthia, Austrian

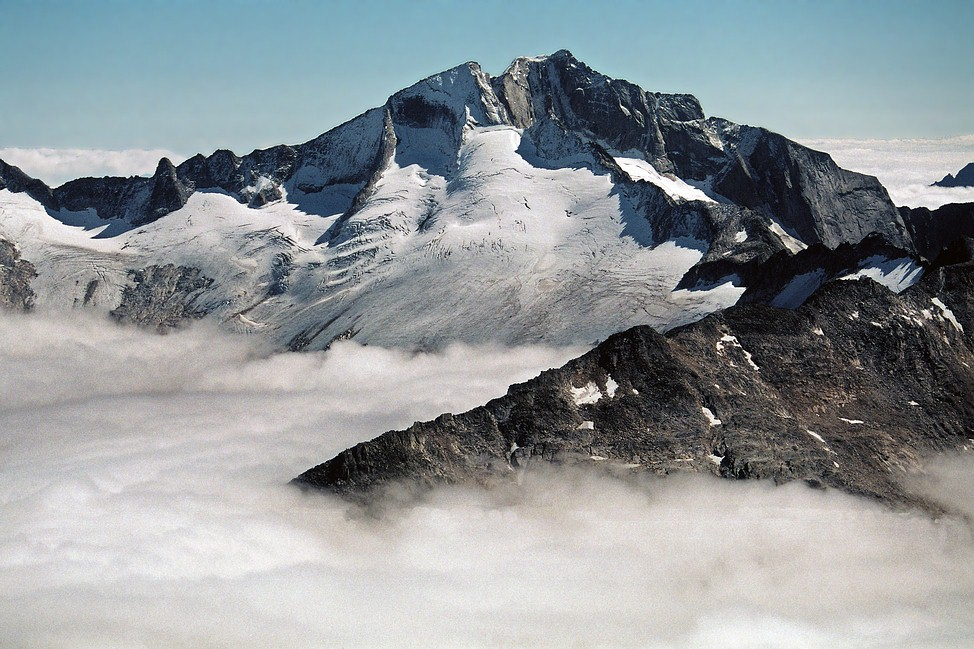
- Hochalmspitze

Highest point
- Elevation: 3,360 m (11,020 ft)
- Prominence: 942 m (3,091 ft)
- Listing: Alpine mountains above 3000 m
- Coordinates: 47°0′56″N 13°15′00″E

Geography
- Location within Alps
- Location: Carinthia, Austria
- Parent range: High Tauern; Ankogel Group

Climbing
- First ascent: 1859, by Paul Grohmann (?)

The Hochalmspitze (3,360 metres above the Adriatic (11,020 ft)) is located east of Mallnitz in the Austrian state of Carinthia. It is sometimes called "Tauern Queen" (German: Tauernkönigin) as a counterpart to the "Tauern King", the Grossglockner.

== Geography ==
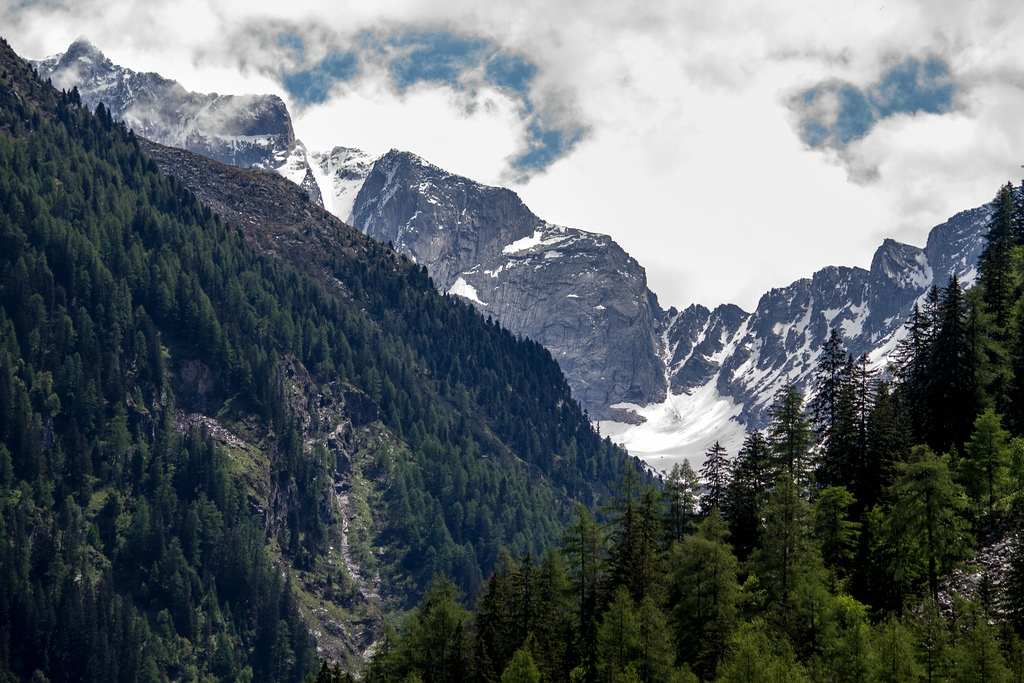
View from West

The peak is situated slightly south the main ridge of the Central Eastern Alps and the Alpine divide. It actually consists of two pinnacles, the Schneeige Hochalmspitze and the higher Apere ("snowless") Hochalmspitze with the summit cross. It has glaciers on its eastern and southern sides. The neighbouring Großelendkopf peak, at 3,317 m (10,883 ft), today counts as a separate mountain.

Like most of the High Tauern, the Hochalmspitze massif is formed of granite and gneiss, and many unusual rock formations can be found on its slopes. The mountain lies at the Eastern end of the range. In the northwest, a ridge connects it to Großer Ankogel, the third highest peak in its group, and to the Kölnbrein Dam. In the south, the Mallnitz Ridge leads to the neighbouring Reisseck Group.

From the summit, the views stretch as far as the Salzburg Alps, the Dolomites and the Julian Alps.

== History ==
The first official ascent was made in 1859 by the Austrian mountaineer Paul Grohmann, although letters found in 2010 bring this claim into disrepute, as the mountain may have first been climbed four years earlier. In 1913 a mountain hut (Gießener Hütte) was erected by the German and Austrian Alpine Club on the southeastern slope at a height of 2,215 m (7,267 ft).

In the 1970s plans for a glacier ski resort were developed, but finally abandoned in 1988 when the Austrian Alpine Club was able to purchase large parts of the area.
