= Ankogel =

Mountain in Austria

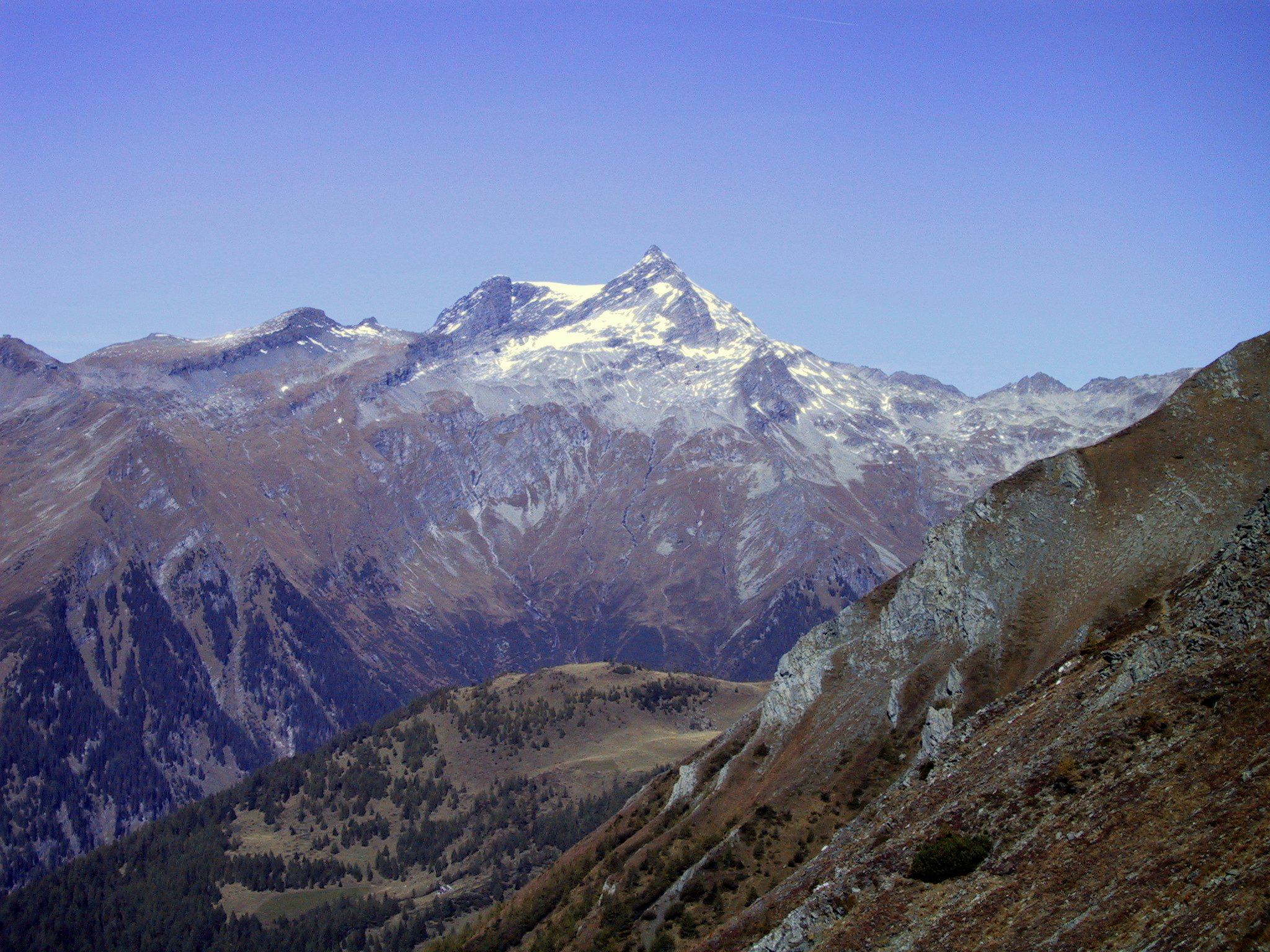
- The Ankogel (centre)

Highest point
- Elevation: 3,252 m (10,669 ft)
- Prominence: 576 m (1,890 ft)
- Listing: Alpine mountains above 3000 m
- Coordinates: 47°03′00″N 13°15′00″E

Geography
- Location within Alps
- Location: Carinthia / Salzburg, Austria
- Parent range: High Tauern

Climbing
- First ascent: c. 1742

The Ankogel (3,252 m) is a mountain in the Ankogel Group in the eastern High Tauern range in Austria. It is the second highest mountain in the group, the Hochalmspitze being higher at 3,360 m.

A cable car from Mallnitz goes up to 2,631 m on the mountain, making Ankogel one of the most accessible alpine peaks.
