= Mühldorf (disambiguation) =

Mühldorf may refer to the following places:

- Mühldorf, a town in Bavaria, Germany, also known as Mühldorf am Inn
- Mühldorf (district), in Bavaria
- Mühldorf, Carinthia, a municipality in Carinthia, Austria
- Mühldorf, Lower Austria, a municipality in Lower Austria, Austria
- Mühldorf bei Feldbach, a municipality in Styria, Austria
