= Reißeck (mountain) =

Mountain in Carinthia, Austria

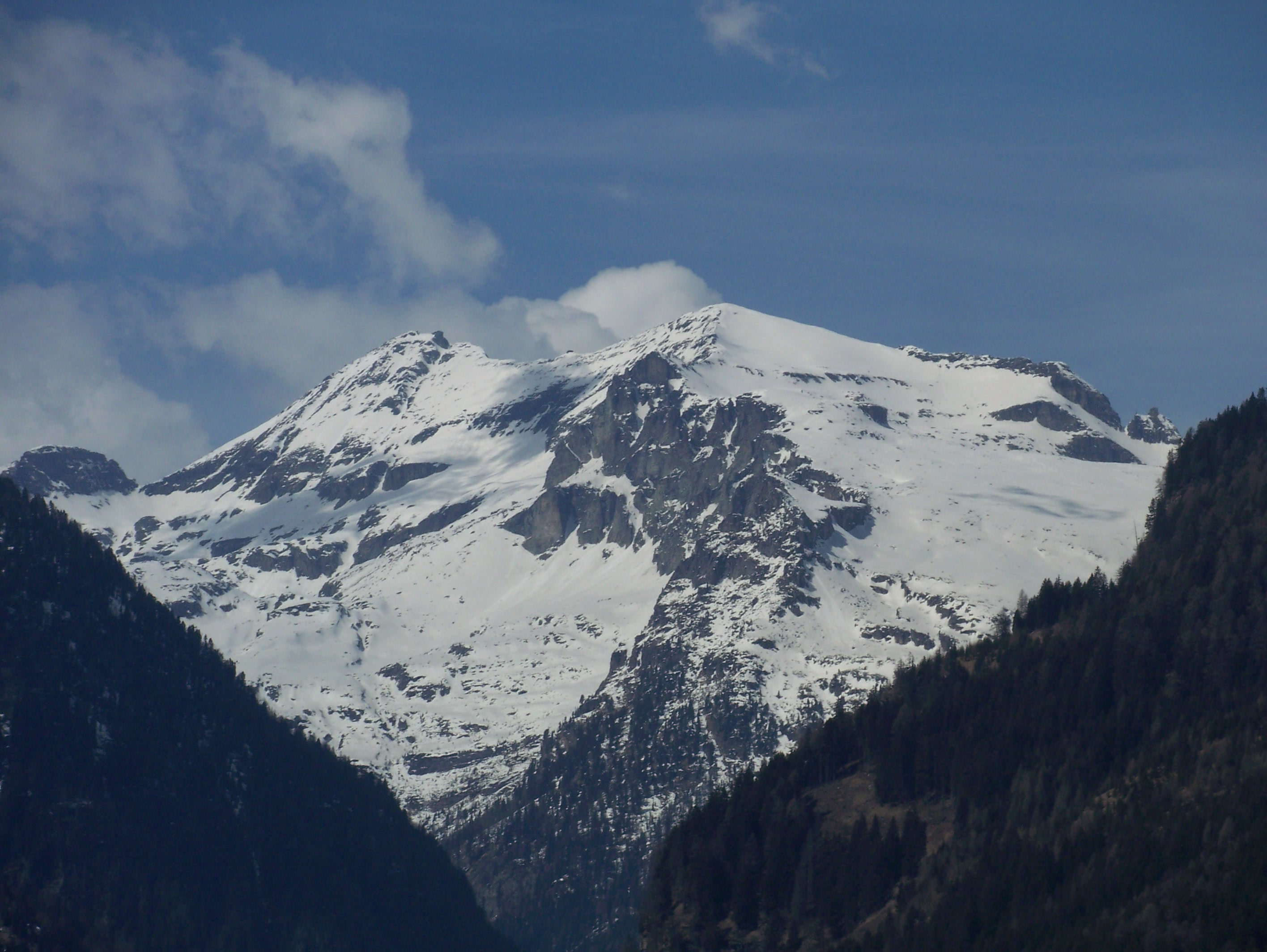
- Großes Reißeck (centre left) and Kleines Reißeck (centre)

Highest point
- Elevation: 2,965 m (AA) (9,728 ft)
- Prominence: 2,965-2,670 m ↓ Pfaffenberger Nocken
- Isolation: 7.8 km → Säuleck
- Listing: Highest mountain of the Reißeck Group
- Coordinates: 46°56′49″N 13°21′52″E

Geography
- Location within Austria
- Location: Carinthia, Austria
- Parent range: Reißeck Group; Ankogel Group

Geology
- Rock type(s): Granite, orthogneiss, schist

Climbing
- Normal route: South arête from Reißeck Hut

The Reißeck, also Großes Reißeck ("Great Reisseck") is, at 2,965 metres above the Adriatic (9,728 ft), the highest peak of the Reißeck Group in the High Tauern of Carinthia, Austria. The range forms the southern part of the larger Ankogel Group with its highest summit, the Hochalmspitze, separated by the col of Mallnitzer Scharte at 2,673 m (8,770 ft). The mountain also gives its name to the Reißeck municipality, located to the south in the Möll valley.

The name Reißeck is derived from an old waterbody name, something like Reisach = "mountain stream" or "torrent", which became the Middle High German rîs = "the falling one".

West and south of the summit block lie the reservoirs of the Verbund Reißeck-Kreuzeck hydropower group, connected with the neighbouring Kölnbrein Dam in the Malta Valley. The Reisseck Railway (Reißeckbahn) funicular and the narrow-gauge Reisseck Mountain Railway, built in the 1950s for the construction of the power station, later ran passenger services and was used for the access of tourists from the Möll valley up to the Alpine huts. Operations on both lines ceased in 2014/2016 and were not resumed so far. The Reißeck Hut, built in 1908 and managed by the ÖGV section of the Austrian Alpine Club, is located at 2,287 m (7,503 ft) in the immediate vicinity of the former Schoberboden top station, right below the dam of the Großer Mühldorfer See reservoir. A nearby hotel and the adjacent small ski area, opened in the 1960s, today are closed.

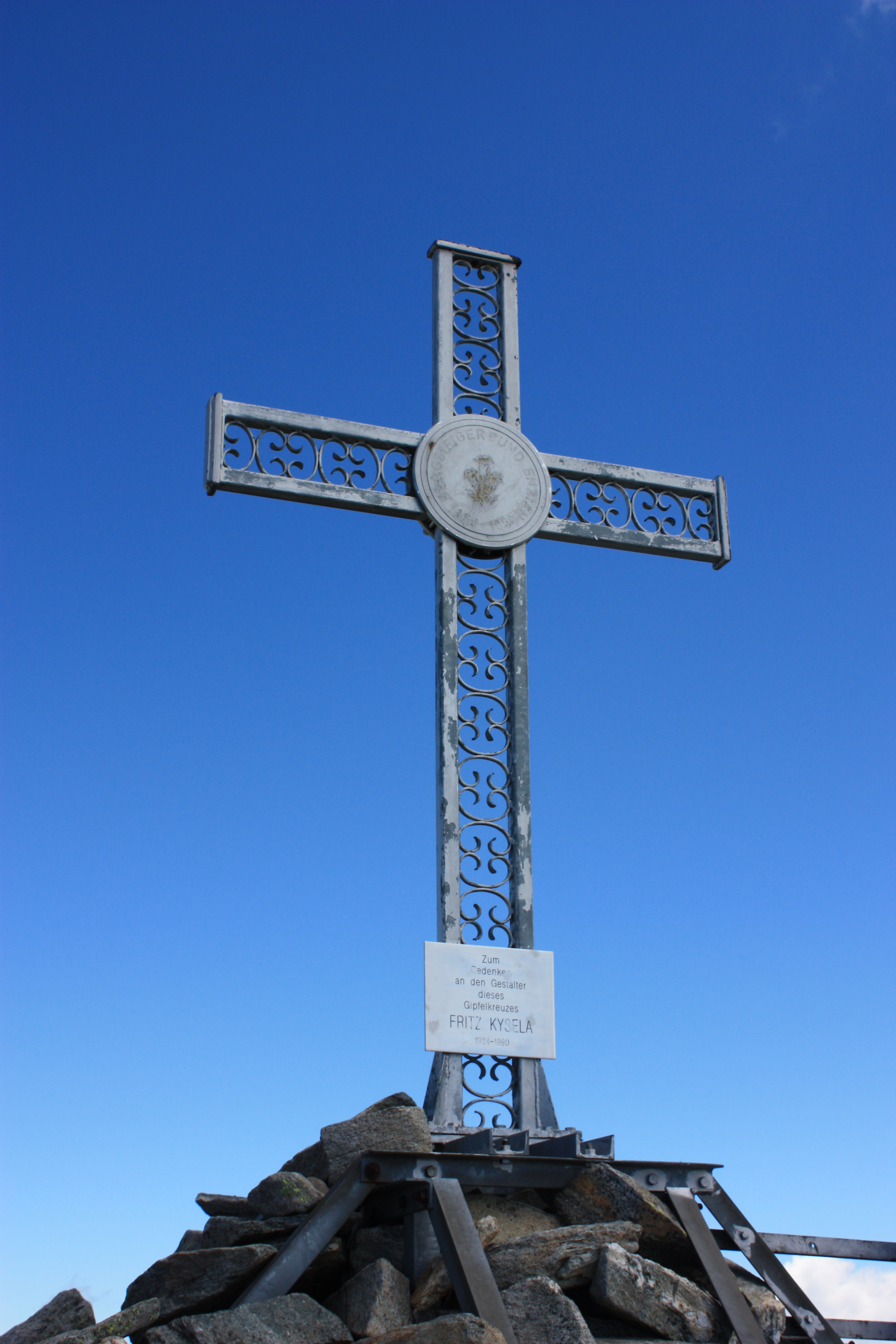
Summit cross

The normal route runs via the Kalte Herberg col and south arête, an easy climb, to the summit, but it does require sure-footedness. Starting points are the Reißeck Hut or the unmanaged Neue Moos Hut. East-northeast of the Großes Reißeck lies the Kleines Reißeck peak ("Little Reisseck", 2,924 m); the ridge crossing runs along steep grassy slopes, but is otherwise technically easy. The Reißeck summit offers panoramic views to the surrounding High Tauern ranges, as well as to the Dolomites, Karawanks and Julian Alps in the south.

== Literature and map ==
- Herbert Gantschacher: Neues Musiktheater 'Kar' - Eine beispielhafte Kooperation zwischen Industrie und Kunst am Reißeck, in Der Kulturmanager, Kognos-Verlag, Stadtbergen, 1998 ISBN 3-9801921-2-1
- Alpine Club map 1:25,000, Sheet 44, Hochalmspitze - Ankogel (the Reißeck is on the lower edge of this map)
