= Reisseck Group =

Mountains in Austria

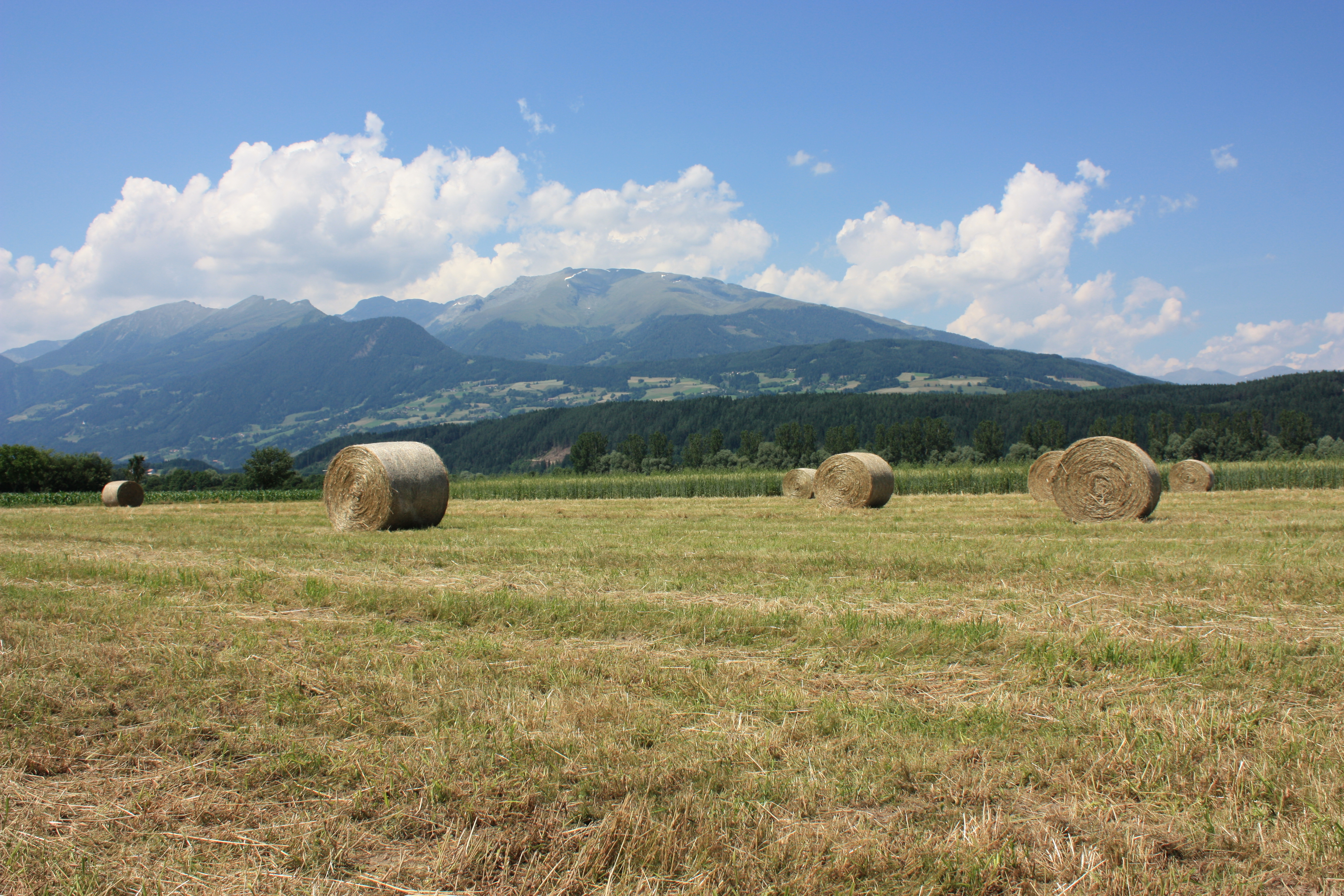
- The Gmeineck peak seen from Spittal in the Drava valley

Highest point
- Peak: Reißeck
- Elevation: 2,965 m above sea level (AA)

Dimensions
- Length: 21 km (13 mi)

Geography
- Location within Alps
- State(s): Carinthia, Austria
- Range coordinates: 46°56′49″N 13°21′52″E
- Parent range: High Tauern; Ankogel Group

Geology
- Rock type: Predominantly gneisses

The Reisseck Group or Reißeck Group (German: Reißeckgruppe) is a small mountain sub-range in the Austrian state of Carinthia. As the southern part of the Ankogel Group, it belongs to the High Tauern range of the Central Eastern Alps.

== Geography ==
The Reisseck Group is separated from the northern Ankogel Group by the Dösen valley, stretching east of Mallnitz up to the Dösener See alpine lake at a height of 2,270 m (7,450 ft), and the Gößgraben gorge down to the Malta Valley. Its eastern boundary is formed by the Malta and Lieser rivers with the town of Gmünd, separating it from the Gurktal Alps (Nock Mountains). To the south, it is bounded by the Möll valley and the neighbouring Kreuzeck Group.

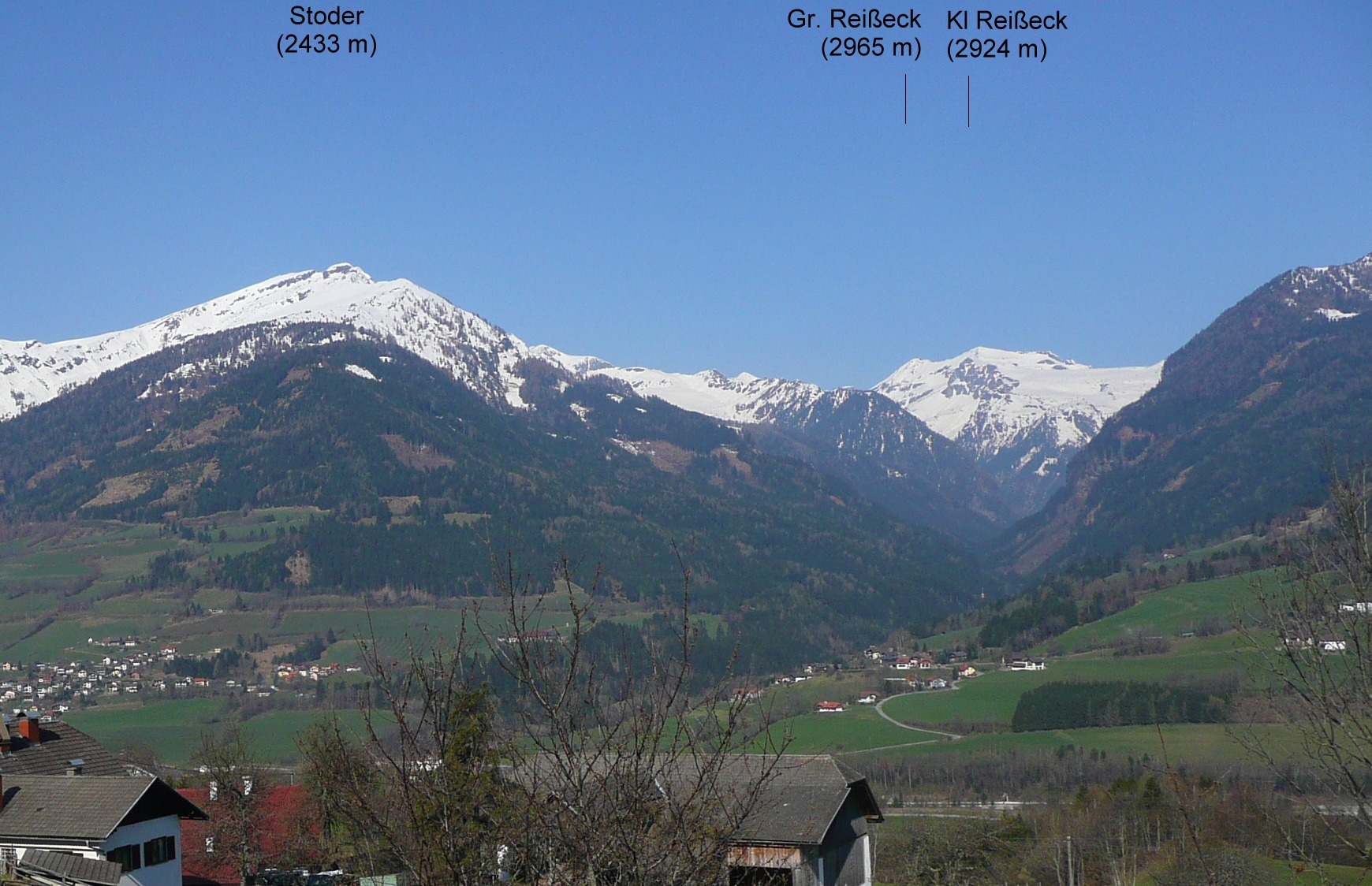
The Reißeck Group including the Stoder and the Reißeck

The Reisseck Group is predominantly formed of gneisses. The highest peak in the mountain range is the Reißeck at 2,965 m (AA) (9,728 ft). Other significant summits are the Tristenspitz (2,930 metres [9,610 ft]), the Hohe Leier (2,774 metres [9,101 ft]) and the Gmeineck (2,592 metres [8,504 ft]). The Kaponig valley in the northwestern Reisseck Group has been part of the High Tauern National Park since 2005.

In the Reisseck Group there are numerous mountain lakes, of which the Radlsee (Hoher See), the Hochalmsee (Spapniksee), the Zwenberger See and Mühldorfer See are the most important. The water is used by the Reißeck-Kreuzeck Hydropower Group to supply the hydroelectric power plants in the Reißeck municipality. For tourists the mountains are accessible from the Möll valley on the Reisseck Funicular. However, service on the former Reisseck Mountain Railway connection to the mountain lakes plateau discontinued in 2014. The former ski area has been closed.

== Literature ==
- Manfred Posch: Reißeck, Kreuzeck. Die schönsten Touren. Klagenfurt, 2000, Kärntner Druck- und Verlagsgesellschaft m.b.H., ISBN 3-85391-176-5
- Michael Krobath, Gerhard Karl Lieb (1 October 2002). "Der Permafrost in der Reißeckgruppe (Hohe Tauern, Kärnten)". Institut für Geographie und Raumforschung, Universität Graz.
