= Dösener See =

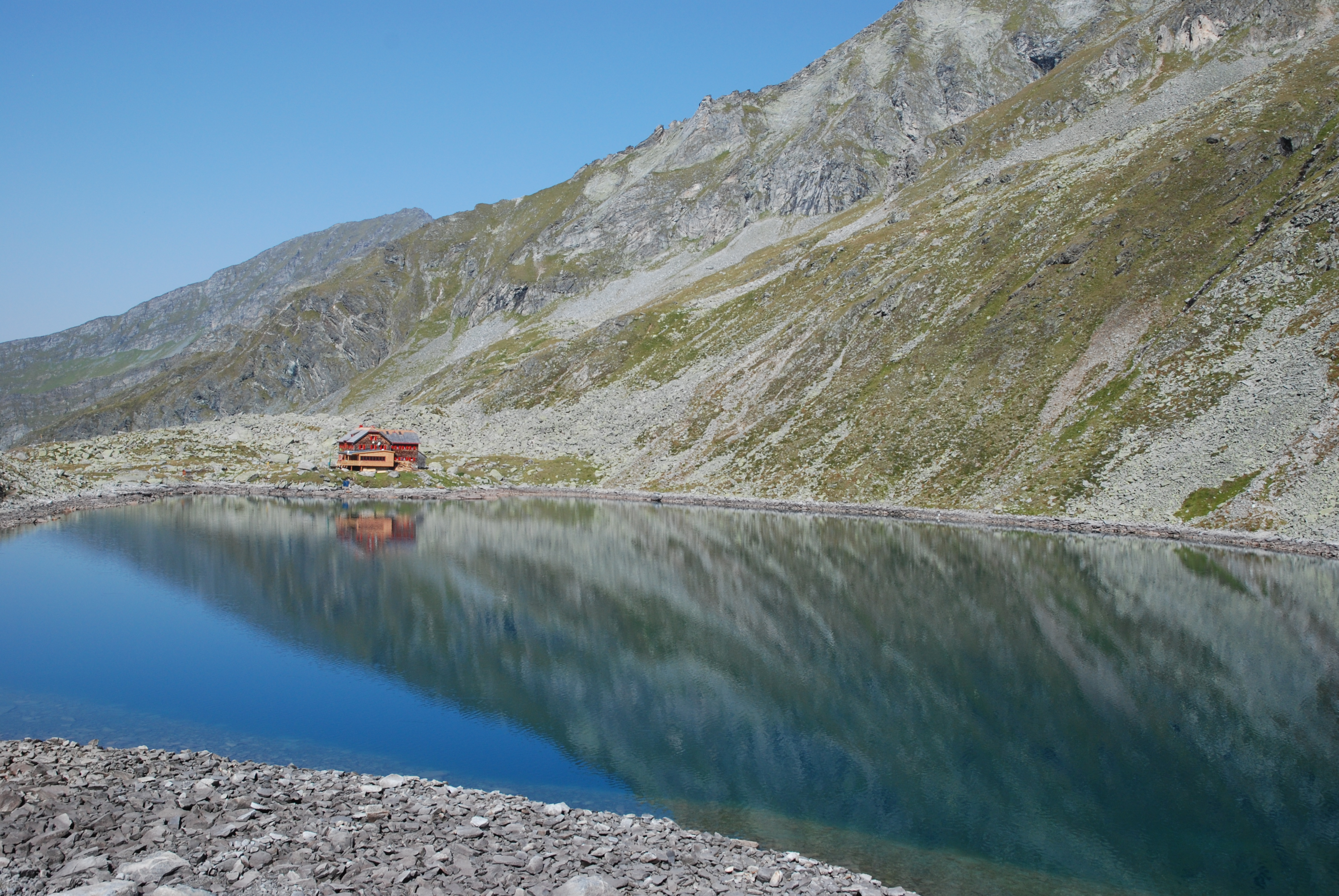
- Dösener See with Arthur-von-Schmid-Haus

- Location within Kärnten Location within Austria
- Location: Carinthia
- Coordinates: 46°59′18″N 13°16′18″E
- Type: glacial lake
- Primary outflows: Dösenbach to Mallnitzbach and Möll river
- Basin countries: Austria
- Max. length: 700 m (2,300 ft)
- Max. width: 225 m (738 ft)
- Surface area: 0.13 km^{2} (0.050 sq mi)
- Max. depth: 44 m (144 ft)
- Surface elevation: 2,270 m (7,450 ft)
- Settlements: Mallnitz

The Dösener See (also Dösnersee) is an alpine lake of Carinthia, Austria. It is part of the High Tauern National Park and located in the municipality of Mallnitz.

== Geography ==
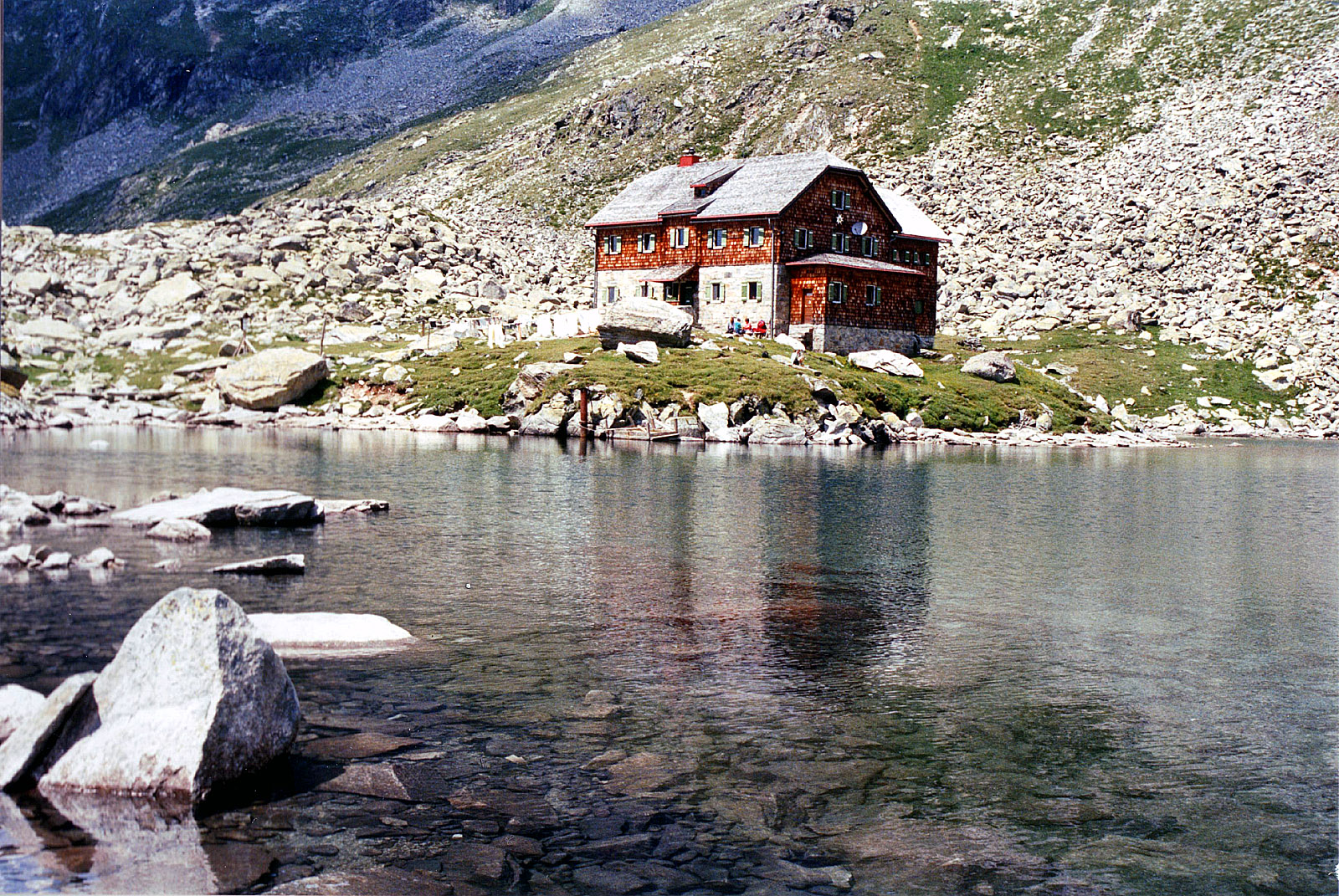
Arthur-von-Schmid-Haus

The lake is situated at 2270 metres above the Adriatic (7,450 ft) in the Ankogel Group of the High Tauern range, part of the Central Eastern Alps. It marks the head of the narrow Dösen Valley, stretching about 7 km (4.3 mi) up from Mallnitz in the west. With a surface area of 0.13 km^{2} (0.050 sq mi), it is the largest cirque lake of the national park area.

Even in summer, the surface temperature never exceeds 7 °C (45 °F); the lake is covered by ice up to three quarters of a year. The water transparency comes to about 12 m (39 ft). In Dösener See, Arctic char are found as well as plankton species like rotifer and green algae.

The Arthur-von-Schmid-Haus, an Alpine club hut erected in 1910–11, stands on the western shore. From here, mountain trails lead to neighbouring summits such as the Hochalmspitze and the Reisseck massif. A large rock glacier (Blockgletscher) is located east of Dösener See, with a permafrost depth of up to 40 metres (130 ft).

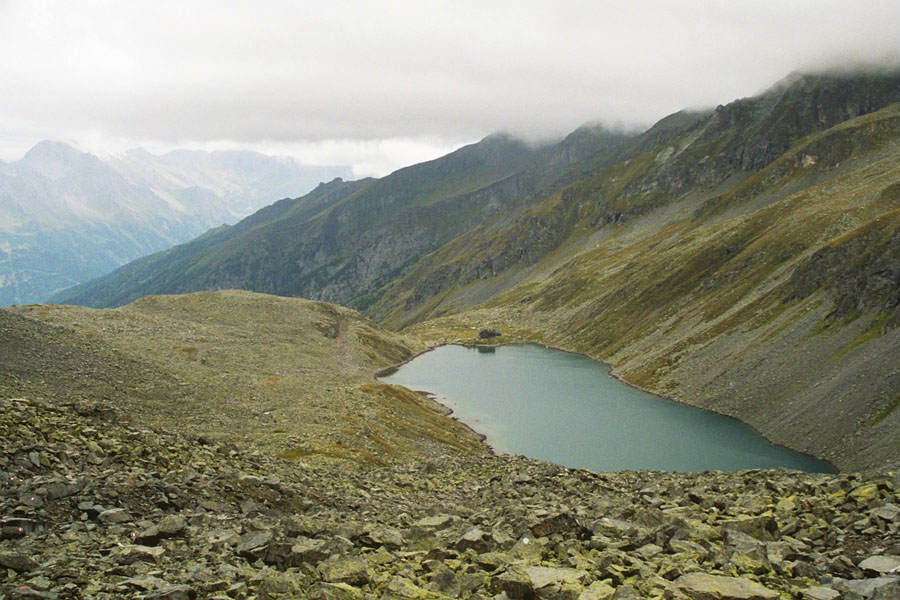
View of the Dösener See from the Buderusweg looking west
