= Mühldorf, Carinthia =

Mühldorf
- Municipality
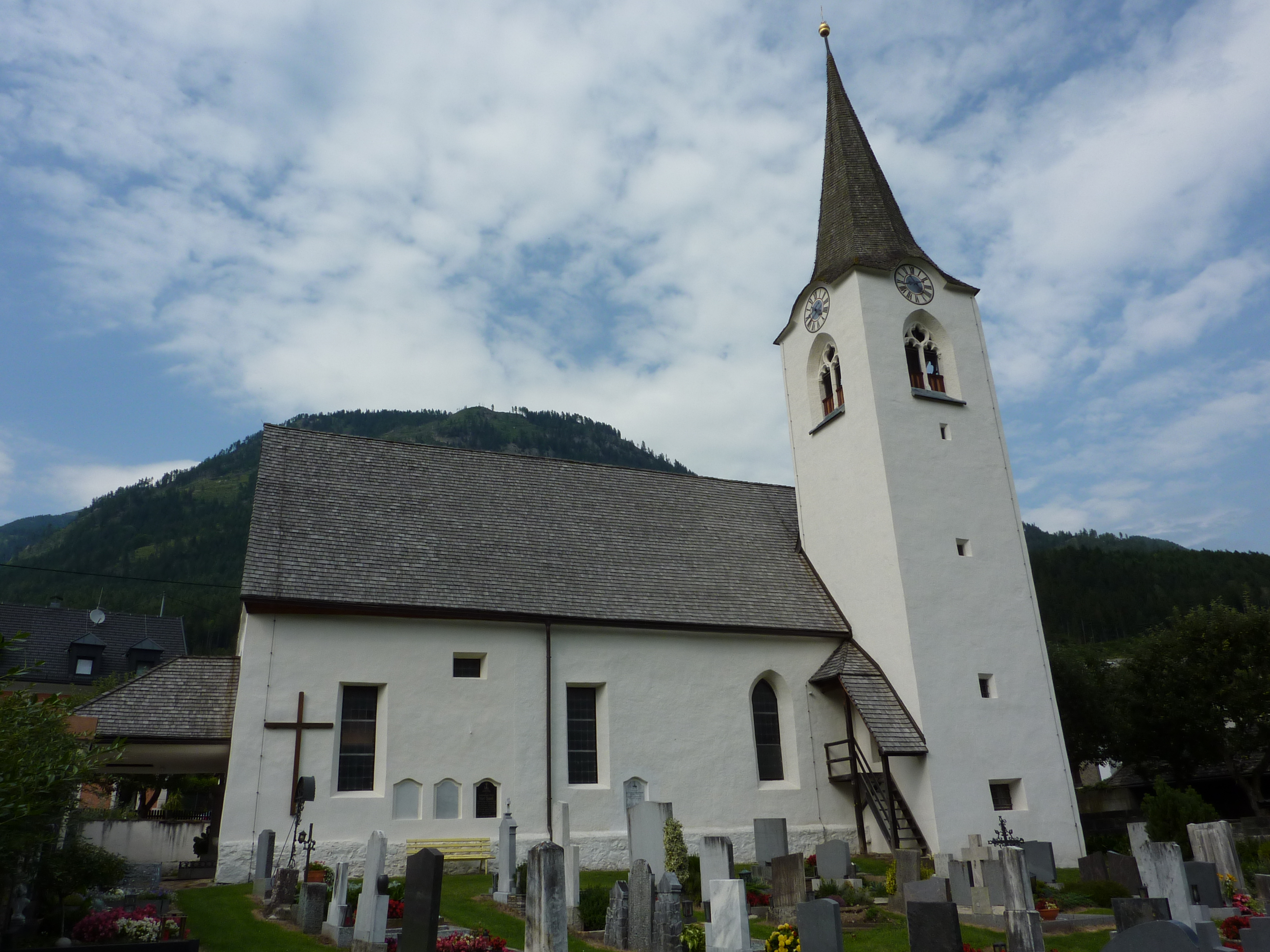
- Parish church

- Coat of arms

- Location within Austria
- Coordinates: 46°51′N 13°21′E
- Country: Austria
- State: Carinthia
- District: Spittal an der Drau

Government
  - Mayor: Erwin Angerer (FPÖ)

Area
  - Total: 24.36 km^{2} (9.41 sq mi)
- Elevation: 613 m (2,011 ft)

Population (2018-01-01)
  - Total: 1,007
  - Density: 41.34/km^{2} (107.1/sq mi)
- Time zone: UTC+1 (CET)
  - Summer (DST): UTC+2 (CEST)
- Postal code: 9814
- Area code: 04769
- Website: www.muehldorf-ktn.at

Mühldorf is a municipality in the district of Spittal an der Drau in the Austrian state of Carinthia.

== Geography ==
It is situated in the lower Möll Valley, between the High Tauern mountain ranges of the Reißeck group in the northeast and the Kreuzeck group in the southwest. The municipality has access to the Tauern Railway line at Mühldorf-Möllbrücke station.

== History ==
The settlement was first mentioned in an 1177 deed; the name Mühldorf referred to the numerous mills in the area. The village probably arose around an older salt mine, once owned by the Benedictine monks of Millstatt Abbey, which soon was abandoned, however. In 1844 a loden cape production was established, the facility exists up to today.

The present-day municipality was constituted in 1850. Incorporated into neighbouring Reißeck from 1973, the Mühldorf citizens again voted for independence in 1992.

== Politics ==
Seats in the municipal assembly (Gemeinderat) as of 2025:

- Freedom Party of Austria (FPÖ): 7
- Social Democratic Party of Austria (SPÖ): 4
- Independents: 4
