= Reißeck =

- Municipality
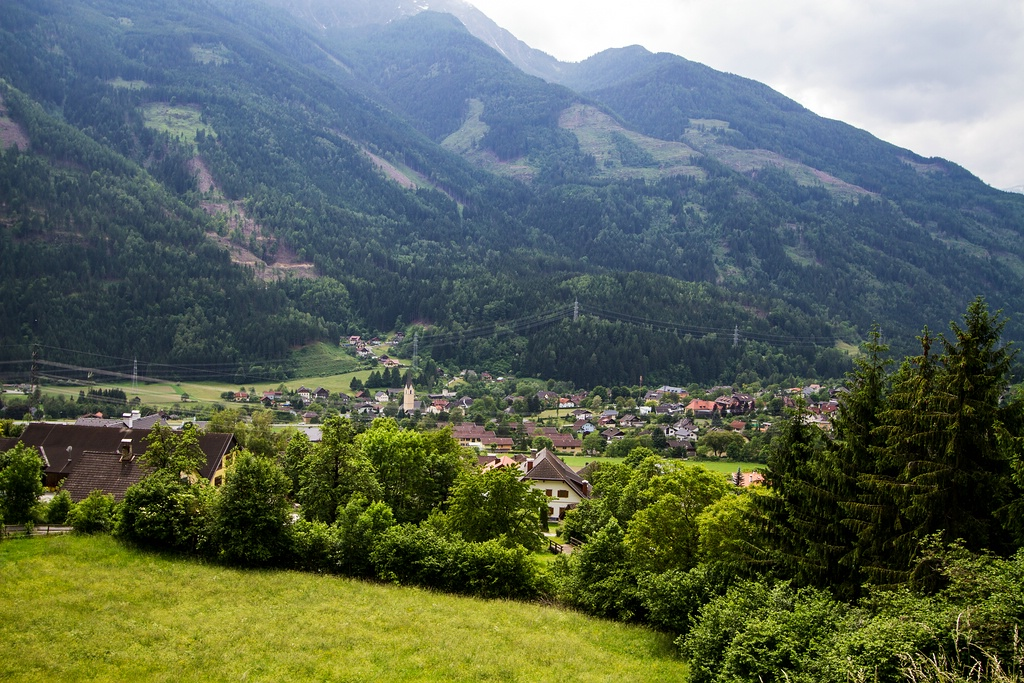
- Kolbnitz

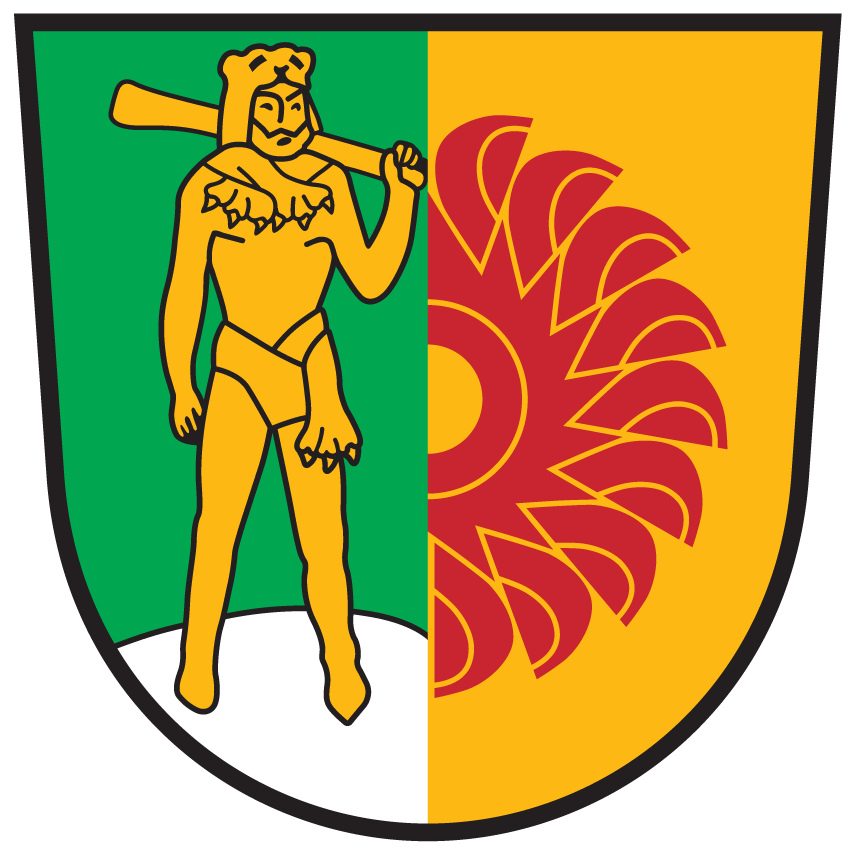
- Coat of arms

- Location within Austria
- Coordinates: 46°53′N 13°18′E
- Country: Austria
- State: Carinthia
- District: Spittal an der Drau

Government
  - Mayor: Gerd Pichler

Area
  - Total: 139.85 km^{2} (54.00 sq mi)
- Elevation: 613 m (2,011 ft)

Population (2016-01-01)
  - Total: 2,199
  - Density: 15.72/km^{2} (40.72/sq mi)
- Time zone: UTC+1 (CET)
  - Summer (DST): UTC+2 (CEST)
- Postal code: 9815, 9816
- Area code: 04783
- Website: www.reisseck.at

Reißeck is a municipality in the district of Spittal an der Drau in Carinthia, Austria.

== Geography ==
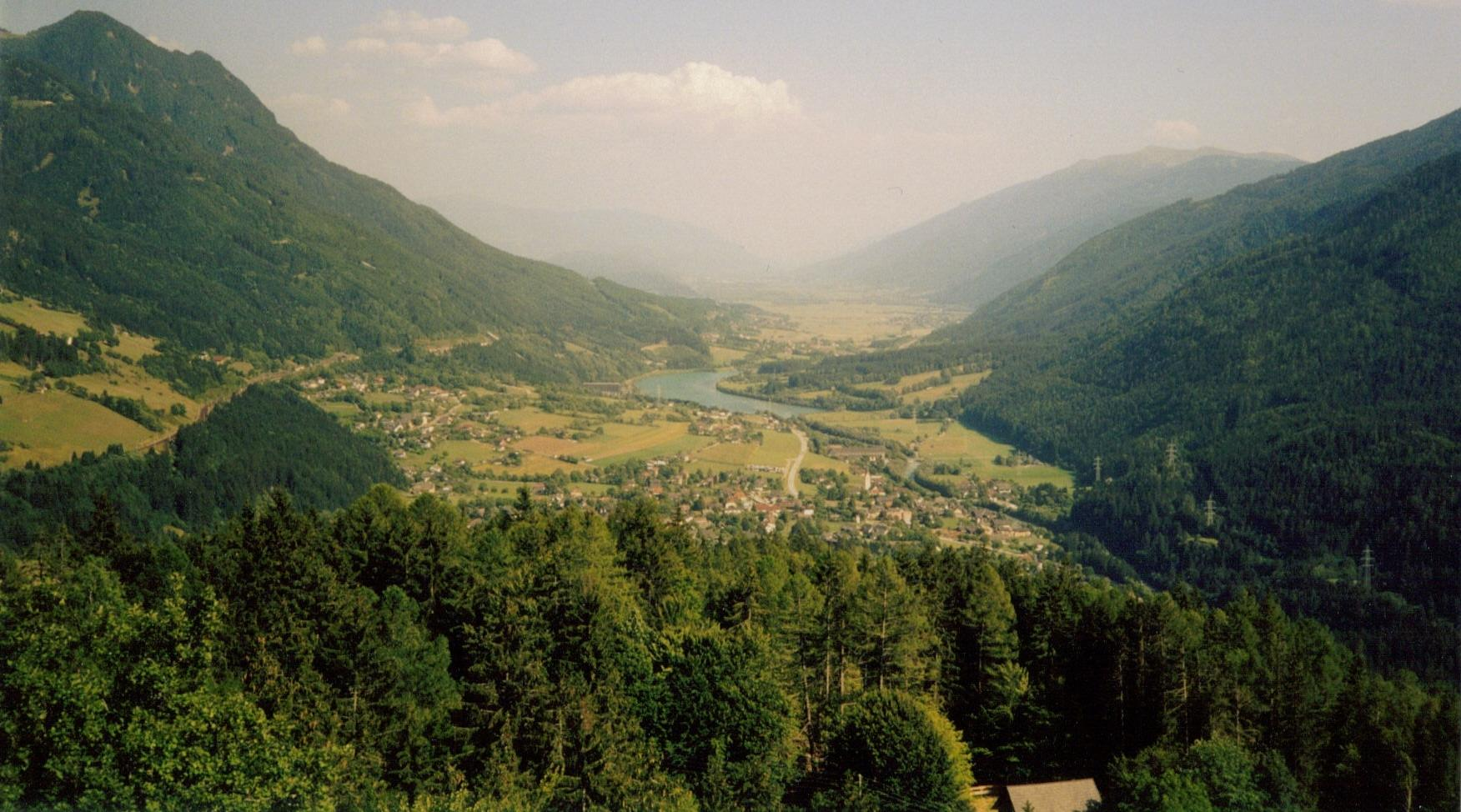
Möll valley, view from Danielsberg

Situated within the valley of the Möll river, a tributary to the Drava, Reißeck is located about 20 kilometres (12 mi) northwest of the district capital Spittal an der Drau. The present-day municipality established in 1973 consists of the four cadastral communities Kolbnitz, Zandlach, Penk, and Teuchl. It was named after the Reißeck massif (2,965m/9,727 ft) in the north, part of the Ankogel Group of the Hohe Tauern mountain range. South of the Möll Valley rises the Kreuzeck Group.

Equidistant between the ski resorts of Ankogel/Mölltal Glacier and Lake Millstatt, facilities in Kolbnitz include a rafting centre, a riding centre, tennis courts, a small ski area and a swimming pool. Two funicular railway lines leave from the Möll valley bottom: the first runs up the Reißeck mountain to an altitude of 2236m/7336 ft to walking trails and a hotel; the second leads to the mountain rail station of Mt. Kreuzeck at 1211m/3973 ft, which is the starting point for several alpine walks up to 2498m/8195 ft. The operation of the Reißeck Höhenbahn on the Reißeck plateau, one of the highest-lying narrow-gauge railroads in Europe, was closed down in 2014.

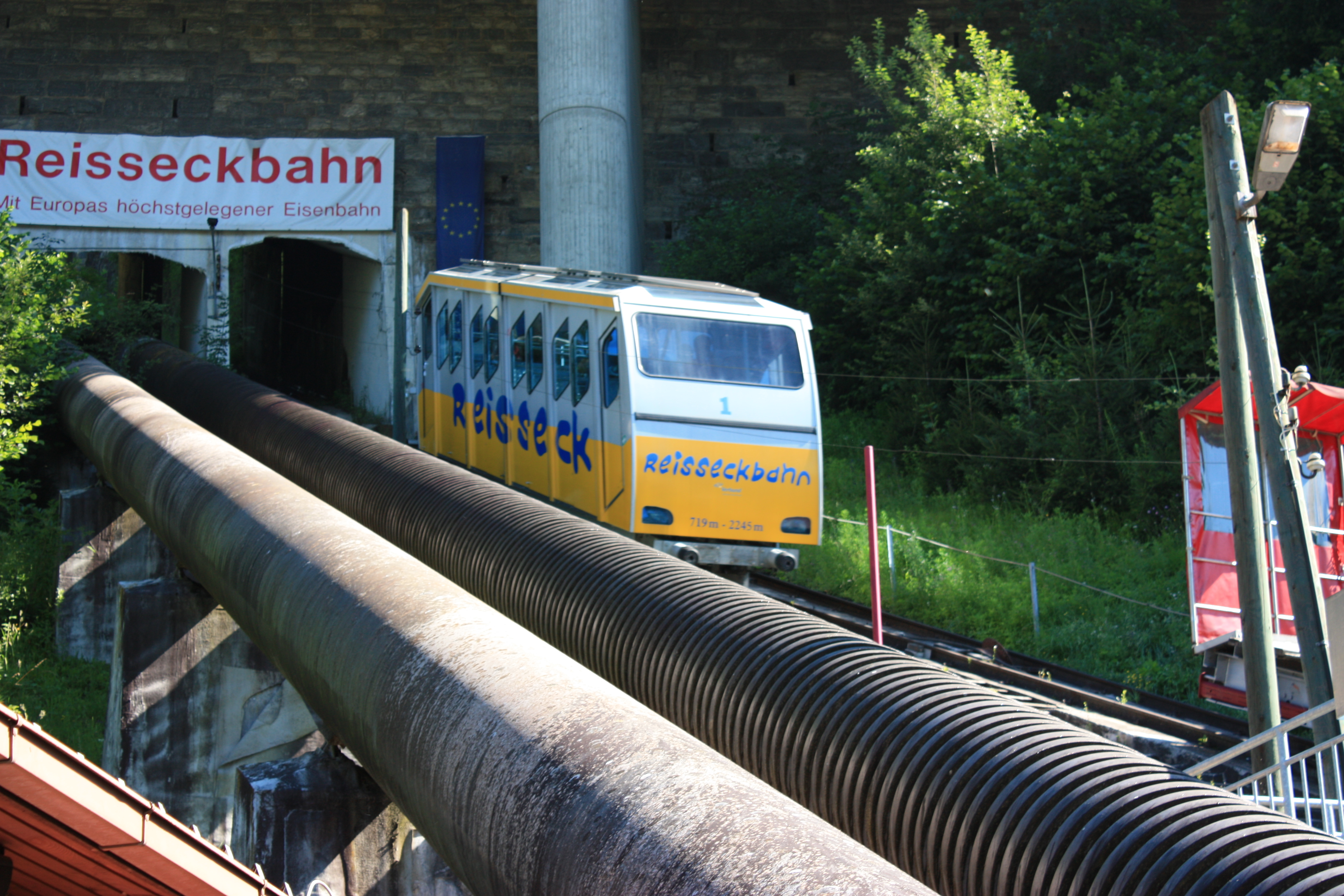
Reißeck funicular

Reißeck has access to the Tauern Railway line, running from Spittal an der Drau through the Tauern Railway Tunnel to Schwarzach im Pongau, at the Kolbnitz and Penk stations. It also can be reached via the parallel Mölltal Straße (B106) highway from Lurnfeld in the Drava valley up to Obervellach and Winklern.

== Kolbnitz ==
The Hohe Tauern mountains are a traditional mining area, mainly for gold, silver and iron. Originally held by the Bishops of Freising, the main village Kolbnitz was first mentioned as Cholomunze in an 1124 deed. Shortly afterwards, the estates passed to the Counts of Gorizia (Meinhardiner dynasty) residing at Falkenstein Castle. About 1460 they were finally seized by the Austrian House of Habsburg ruling in the Duchy of Carinthia.

In the course of a 1973 administrative reform, Kolbnitz an der Tauernbahn was merged with neighbouring Penk and Mühldorf into the municipality of Reißeck. In 1992 Mühldorf again separated to become a commune in its own right.

== Danielsberg ==
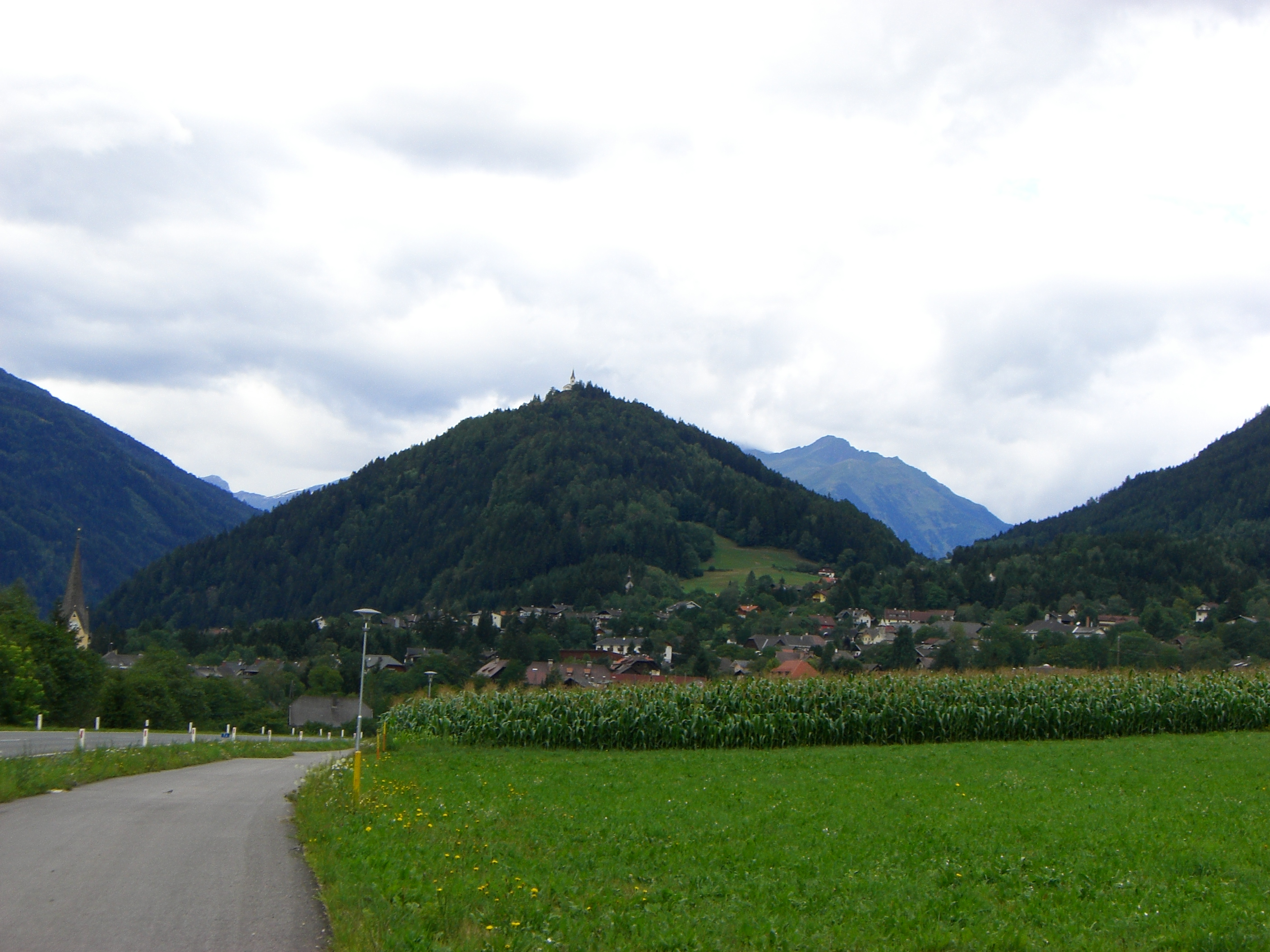
Danielsberg

A cup marked stone found on the cone shaped 966 m (3170 ft) Danielsberg mountain northwest of Kolbnitz denote a settlement since the days of the Stone Age. Further archaeological artifacts near the water well at the summit of the prominent peak indicate the existence of a Celtic sacred grove and a Roman temple dedicated to Hercules. An Early Christian chapel consecrated to prophet Daniel was probably erected at the site about 313.

After Bishop Modestus had Christianized the area again in the 8th century, a new St George church was built at the summit in 1127. It was first mentioned as monte sancti Danielis in 1292 report of an unsuccessful campaign by late Count Meinhard I of Gorizia and his father-in-law Count Albert IV of Tyrol against the Carinthian duke Bernhard von Spanheim. The church was enlarged in 1515 and a steeple attached in 1750. Beneath the church is the Herkuleshof, now a hotel, erected in 1908.

== Hydropower ==
Reißeck has two hydroelectric power plants (Kraftwerk Kolbnitz and Kraftwerk Rottau) run by the Verbund power company. The water is collected in several reservoirs in the Reißeck (linked with the Kölnbrein Dam in the upper Malta valley) and Kreuzeck mountains and lead to the plant through five penstocks with a maximum altitude difference of about 1772m/5815 ft. Seven (Kraftwerk Kolbnitz) resp. four (Kraftwerk Rottau) Pelton wheels, generating a maximum electric power of 138 to 220 Megawatt each, provide an overall annual electricity production of 1013 mio Kilowatt hours.

== Politics ==
Seats in the municipal assembly (Gemeinderat) as of 2015 local elections:

- Social Democratic Party of Austria (SPÖ): 10
- Freie Liste Reißeck (Independent): 7
- Freedom Party of Austria (FPÖ): 2

=== Twin towns — sister cities ===
Reißeck is twinned with:

- Königsbronn, Germany
- Thalmässing, Germany
