= Reisseck Railway =

Mountain railway in Austria

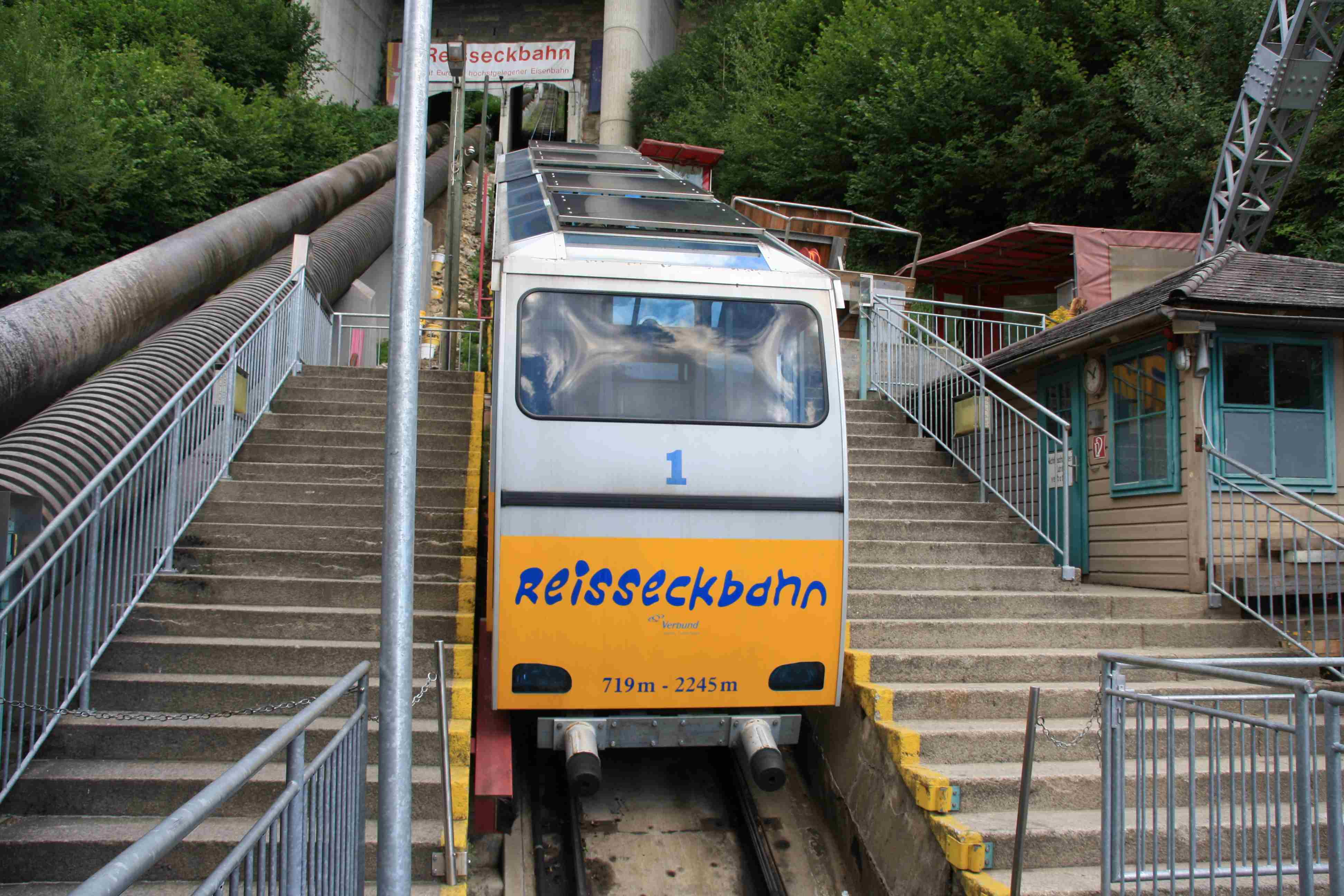
The valley station. Left: the water pressure pipe

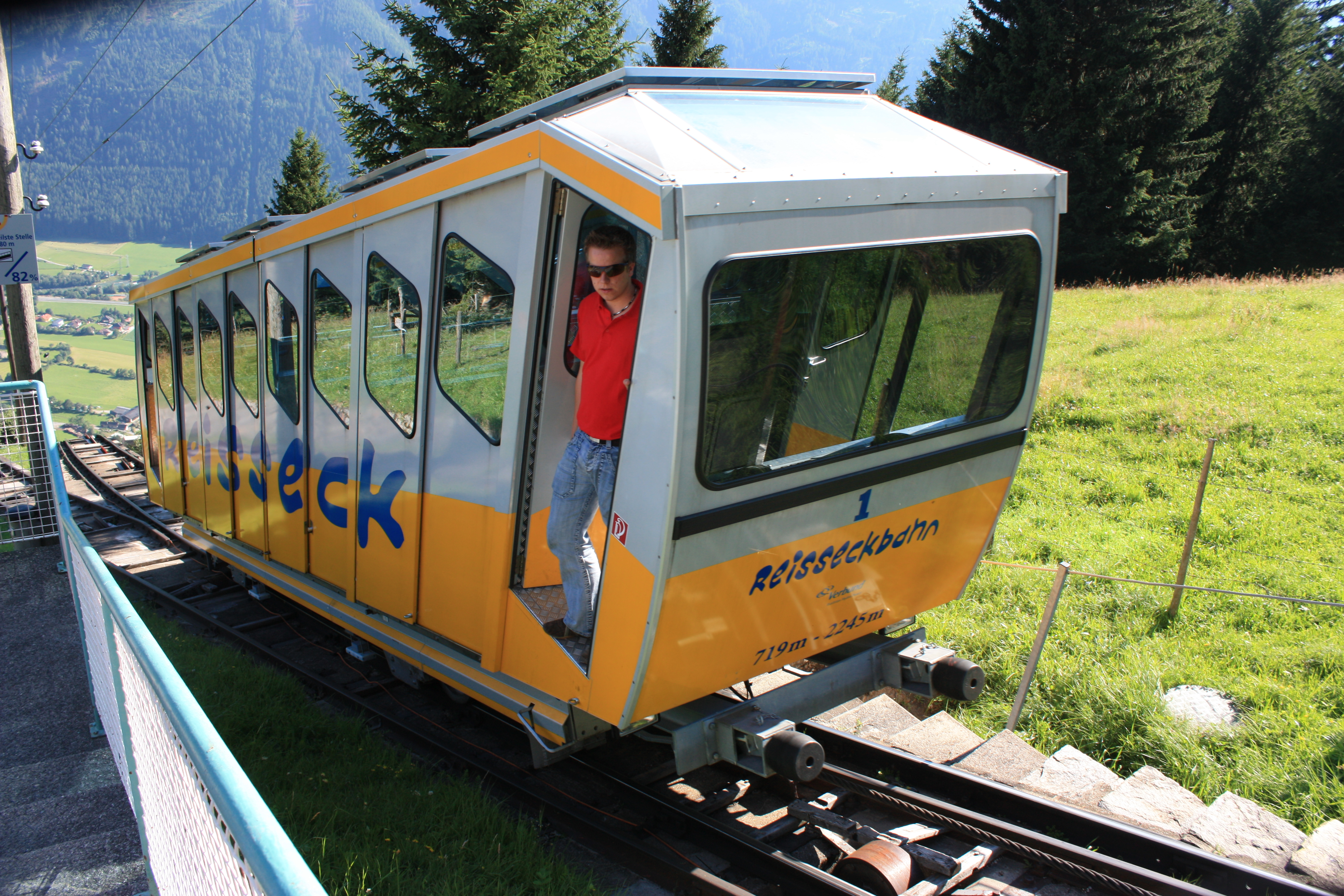
The Reisseck Funicular (Section 1) at the Schütter waystop

The Reisseck Railway (sometimes Reißeck Railway, German: Reißeckbahn) was a mountain railway, that ran from Carinthia's Möll valley into the Reißeck Group, a small mountain range in southern Austria. It comprised the Reisseck Funicular and the Reisseck Mountain Railway (a narrow-gauge railway).

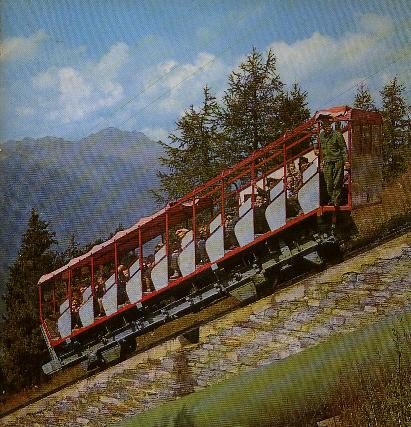
The old railway in 1968 alongside the pipe

== Overview ==
The Reisseck Railway started in Kolbnitz in the Möll valley at a height of 719 m (AA) (2,359 ft) and ended for passenger services at the Berghotel Reisseck at a height of 2,250 m above sea level (AA) (7,380 ft)

Further sections of line ended at about 2,400 m (7,900 ft). On the opposite side of the valley is another funicular, the Kreuzeck Railway, which is still operating. The lines were operated by Tauern Touristik.

Originally the railway was built to transport materiel to the dam and power station of the Reisseck-Kreuzeck power station. After various modifications and expansions its main function was to provide passenger services.

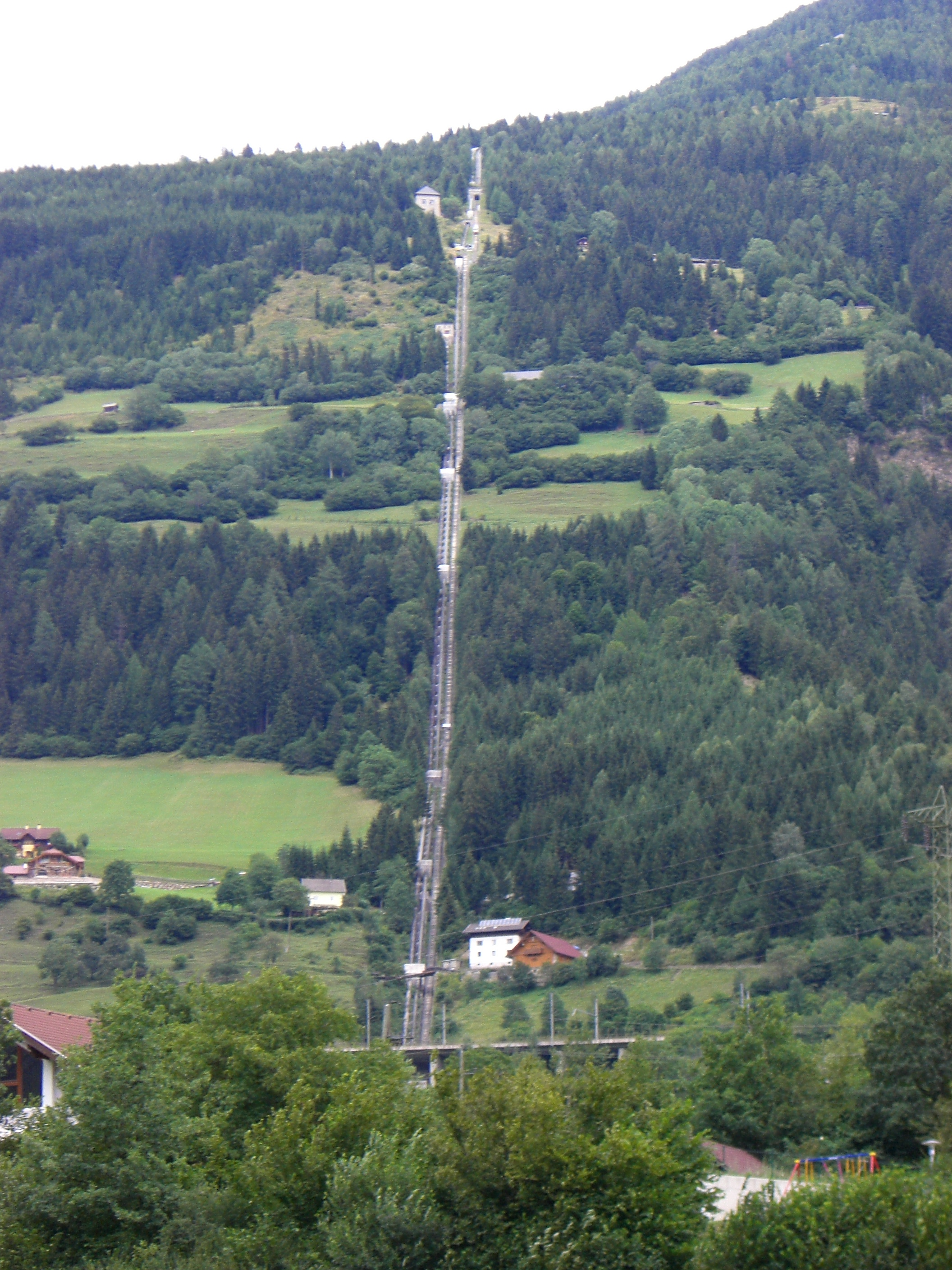
Section 1 of the funicular

The railway closed in 2016 during construction work at Schoberboden and never reopened.

== Reisseck Funicular ==
The Reisseck Funicular was a metre-gauge line and consisted of 3 sections with a total length of around 3,500 m (11,500 ft). It climbed through 1,517 m (4,977 ft) in height. The highest station was at 2,236 m (7,336 ft) by the Schoberboden. Next to the funicular is a pipe, 4,234.5 m (13,893 ft) long, that carries water from the lakes of Großer Mühldorfer See, Kleiner Mühldorfer See, Hochalmsee and Radlsee into the Möll valley to the Reisseck-Kreuzeck storage reservoir.

Each section of the line was worked by coaches with 64 seats that were hauled by 40-millimetre-thick (1.6 in) cables from their upper stations. The diameter of the electrically driven cable drums was 3.85 m (12.6 ft). The gradient of the line varied between 25 and 82%.

In 2018, it was used one last time to transport a pump motor. In January 2022, the funicular was dismantled.

Kilo- metrage	Mileage	Height		Station or stop	Remarks	Location
Kilo- metrage	Mileage	m	ft	Station or stop	Remarks	Location
0.0	0	719	2,359	Zandlach	Bottom station	Zandlach 46°52′48.17″N 13°18′58.43″E
1.185	0.736	1,270	4,170	Schütter	Connection between sections 1 and 2	46°53′18.42″N 13°19′7.42″E
2.475	1.538	1,749	5,738	Trog	Connection between sections 2 and 3	46°53′49.86″N 13°19′27.85″E
3.650	2.268	2,236	7,336	Schoberboden	Connection between sections 3 and the Reisseck Mountain Railway	46°54′12.96″N 13°20′0.43″E

Section	Length		Height difference		Average gradient	Maximum gradient
Section	km	mi	m	ft	Average gradient	Maximum gradient
Zandlach – Schütter	1.185	0.736	551	1,808	55 %	82 %
Schütter – Trog	1.290	0.802	479	1,572	51 %	74 %
Trog – Schoberboden	1.130	0.702	487	1,598	49 %	76 %
