= Mühldorf bei Feldbach =

- Former municipality
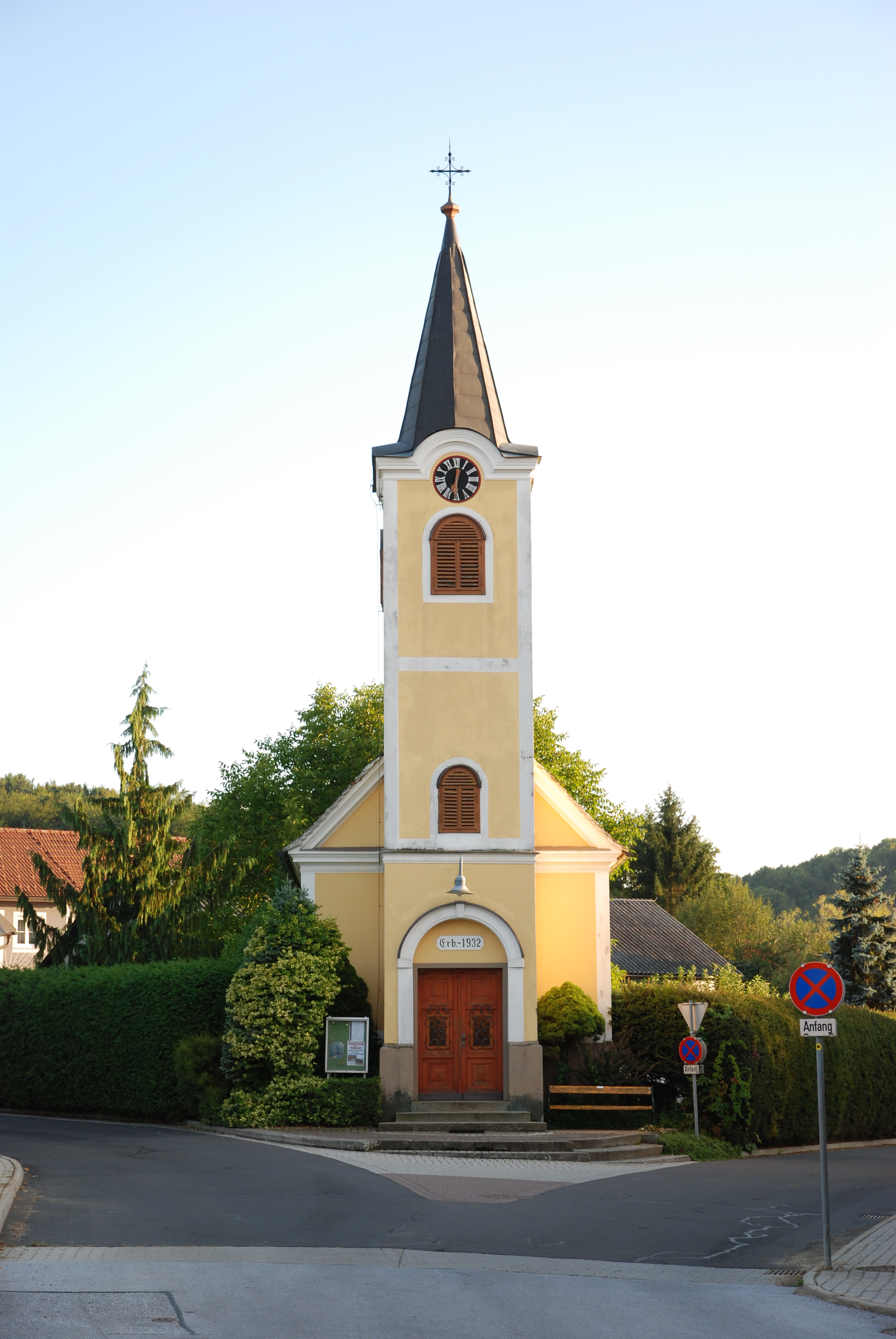

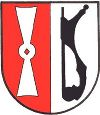
- Coat of arms

- Location within Austria
- Coordinates: 46°56′00″N 15°54′00″E
- Country: Austria
- State: Styria
- District: Südoststeiermark

Area
  - Total: 17.61 km^{2} (6.80 sq mi)
- Elevation: 290 m (950 ft)

Population (1 January 2016)
  - Total: 3,069
  - Density: 174.3/km^{2} (451.4/sq mi)
- Time zone: UTC+1 (CET)
  - Summer (DST): UTC+2 (CEST)
- Postal code: 8330
- Area code: +43 3152
- Vehicle registration: FB
- Website: www.muehldorf-feldbach. steiermark.at

Mühldorf bei Feldbach (literally Mühldorf near Feldbach) is a former municipality in the district of Südoststeiermark in the Austrian state of Styria. Since the 2015 Styria municipal structural reform, it is part of the municipality Feldbach.

== Population ==
Historical population
Year	Pop.	±%
1869	1,324	—
1880	1,466	+10.7%
1890	1,625	+10.8%
1900	1,660	+2.2%
1910	1,758	+5.9%
1923	1,800	+2.4%
1934	1,928	+7.1%
1939	1,929	+0.1%
1951	2,014	+4.4%
1961	2,188	+8.6%
1971	2,529	+15.6%
1981	2,712	+7.2%
1991	2,701	−0.4%
2001	2,905	+7.6%
2013	3,125	+7.6%
