= Reisseck Mountain Railway =

Railway line in Austria

Reisseck Mountain Railway Reißeck-Höhenbahn Schoberboden - Hochalmsee
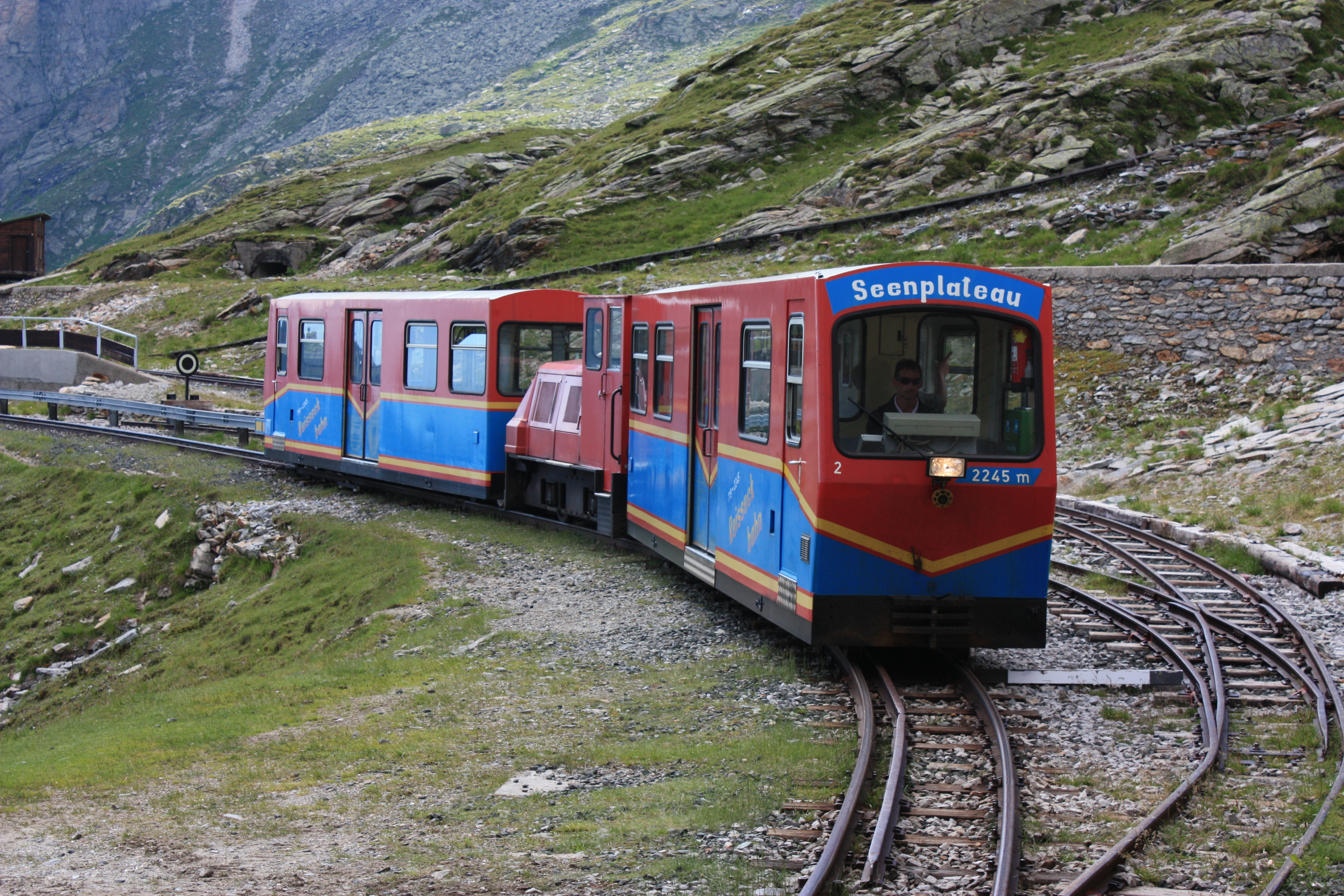
- The Reißeck Mountain Railway shortly before the terminus of Seenplateau/Berghotel Reißeck

Overview
- Locale: Carinthia, Austria

Technical
- Line length: 3.3/~6.9 km
- Track gauge: 600 mm

The Reisseck Mountain Railway (German: Reißeck-Höhenbahn) was a narrow gauge railway with a track gauge of 600 mm, that started at the top station of Schoberboden on the Reisseck Funicular Railway in Austria. It was closed in 2014.

== History ==
An industrial railway was required for the construction of the Reißeck-Kreuzeck Power Station. The line opened on 1 July 1953. Because, following the completion of the construction work, the line had to be kept going for maintenance reasons, it was decided to open the railway to tourists as well. The Reisseck Mountain Railway Company (Reißeck-Höhenbahngesellschaft mbH) was founded in 1969, although public services did not begin until 16 September 1965.

== Route ==
Together with the Reisseck Funicular the Reisseck Mountain Railway links Schoberboden with the Seenplateau ("Lake Plateau"). The line was 3,359 metres long, of which 2,130 metres ran through a tunnel. The terminus for passenger services was at the hotel of Berghotel Reißeck at 2,250 m (AA) (Berghotel Reißeck 46°55′1″N 13°22′5″E). That meant the lines was the highest railway in Austria open to the public and one of the highest in Europe without a rack section. One train could carry 68 passengers.

== Rolling stock ==
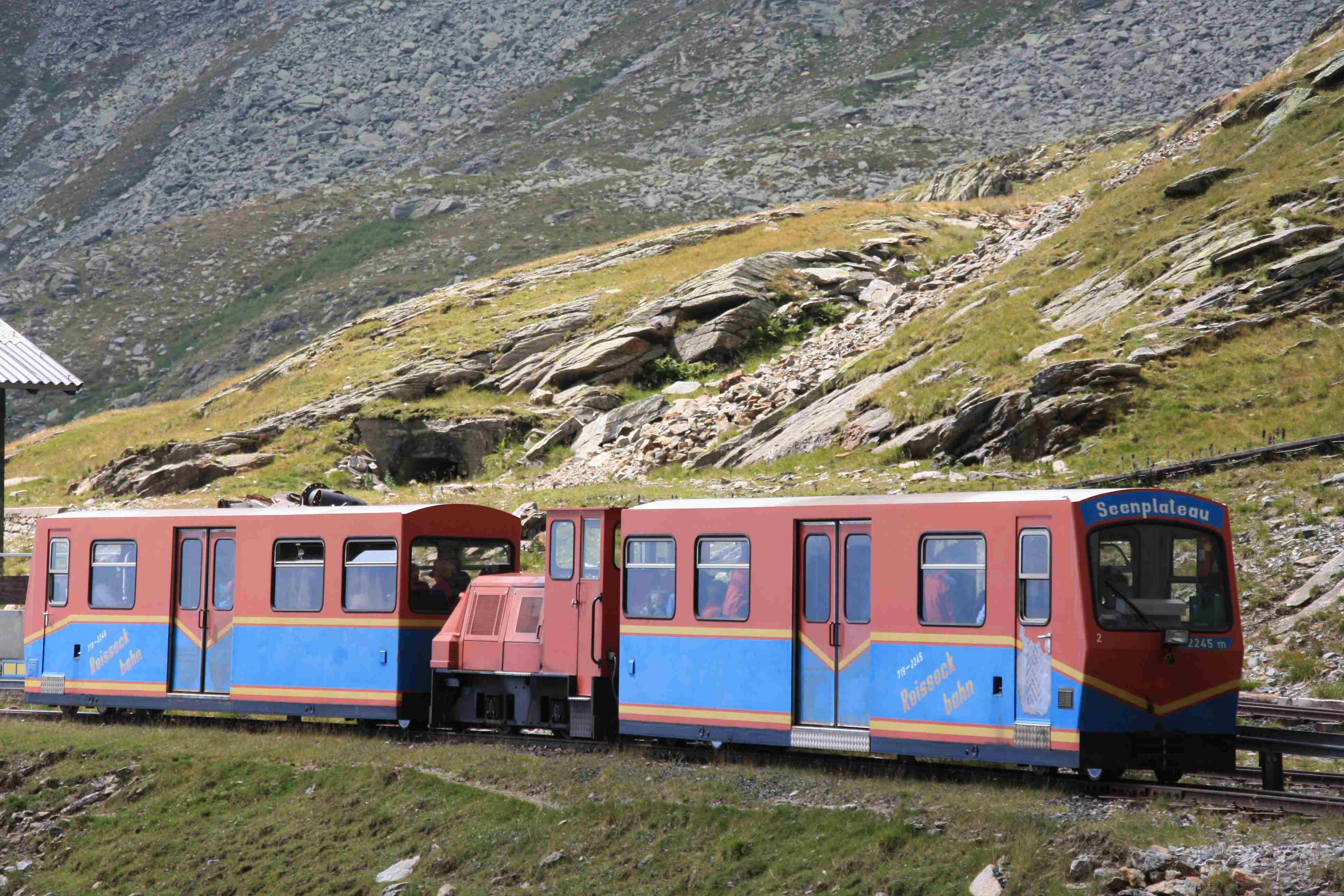
The narrow gauge line with the locomotive in the middle

Class	Year of Manufacture	Manufacturer	Remarks
JW 20	1960	Jenbacher Werke	Snow clearing locomotive
JW 20	1963	Jenbacher Werke	Reserve locomotive
JW DH40B6	1983	Jenbacher Werke	

Until 1983 self-built coaches with 36 seats were used for passenger services. They had a compartment at the end of the coach for the conductor. In 1983, two driving coaches were supplied by Knotz, each with a length of 10 metres and fitted for 14 seats and 20 standing places.

== Branches ==
Shortly before the terminus at the Seenplateau a 250-metre-long industrial, cable railway branched off. This was divided into two adhesion sections to the Hochalmsee and the Radlsee, most of which ran in a roughly 3-kilometre-long tunnel and was only authorised for goods transported for Verbund. These lines terminated at about 2,400 m.

== Closure ==
On 1 August 2014 heavy rain washed away parts of the trackbed of the mountain railway. On 9 August an emergency service was opened using a temporary halt. On 7 September 2014 the operation of the railway, which was intended to be replaced by busses, was finally ended. The conversion of the tunnel into a road for the use of busses to the lakes required the dismantling of the trackage as well as the water pipe running through the tunnel to Reißeck I Power Station. Because this work could not initially be carried out due to delays in the construction of Reißeck II Power Station, tourist services ended for the foreseeable future at the Schoberboden.

== Gallery ==
Track cleaning, summer 2014

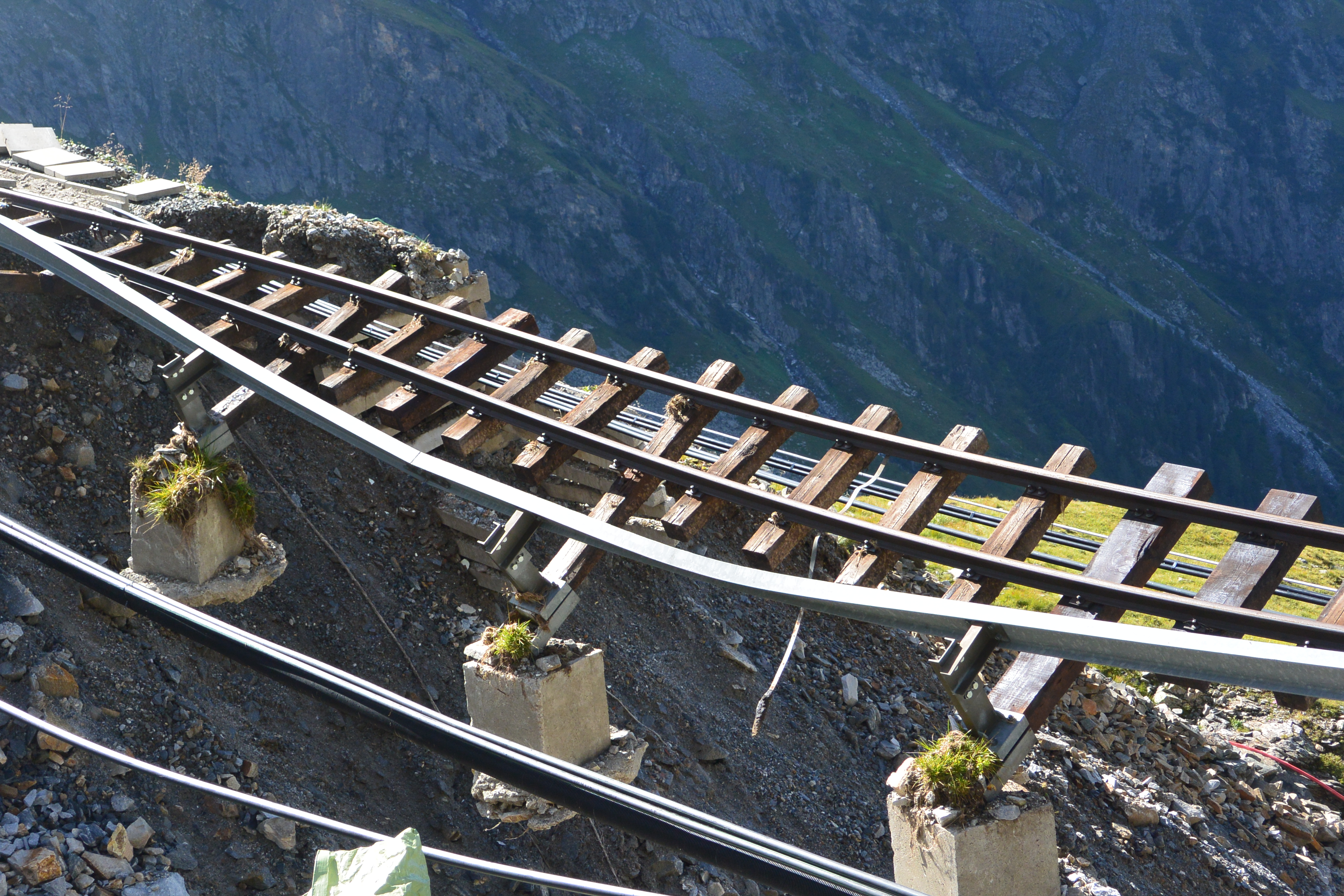
Section of washed away trackbed

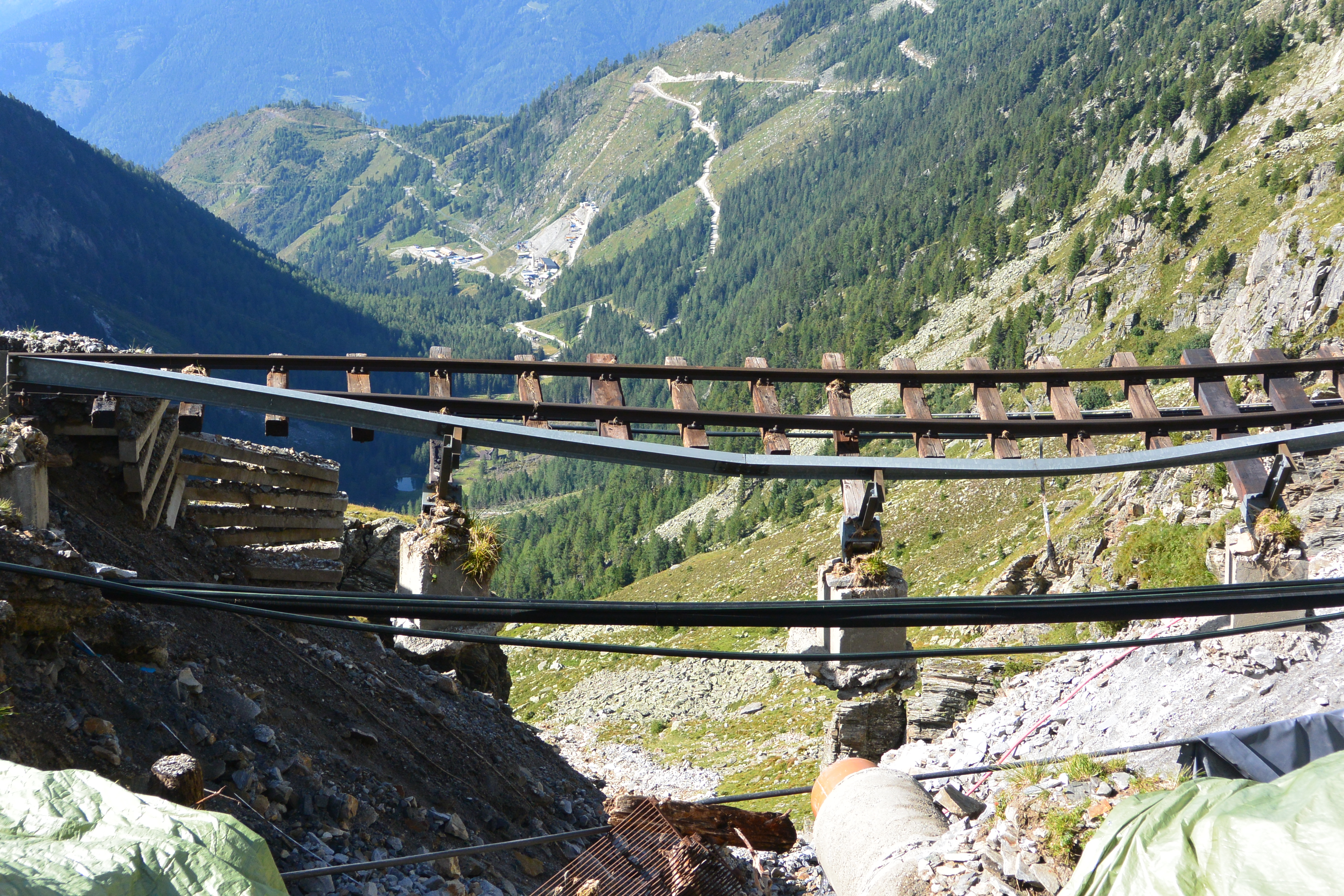
Section of washed away trackbed

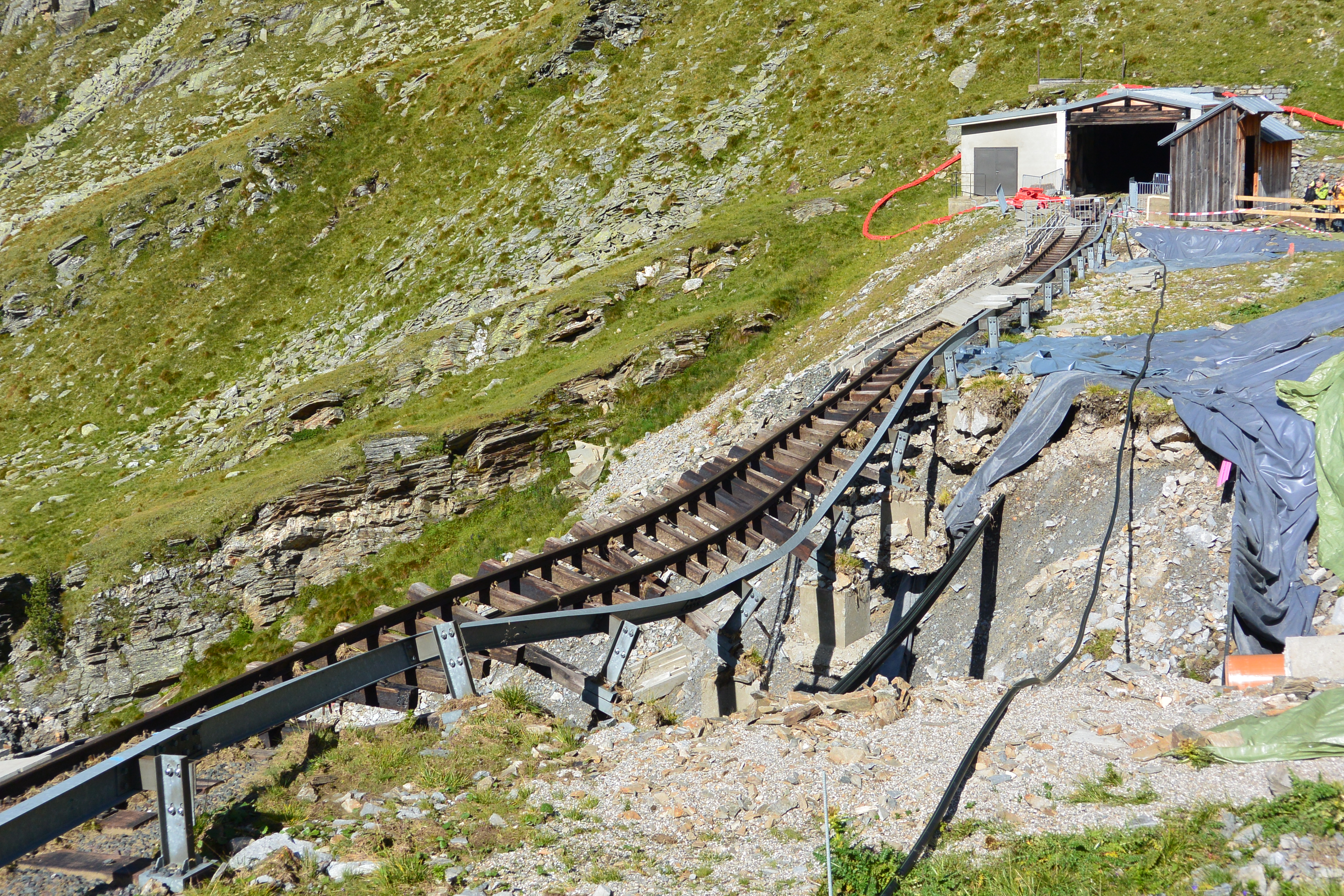
Section of washed away trackbed
